= Nina Simone discography =

Recordings by the American musician

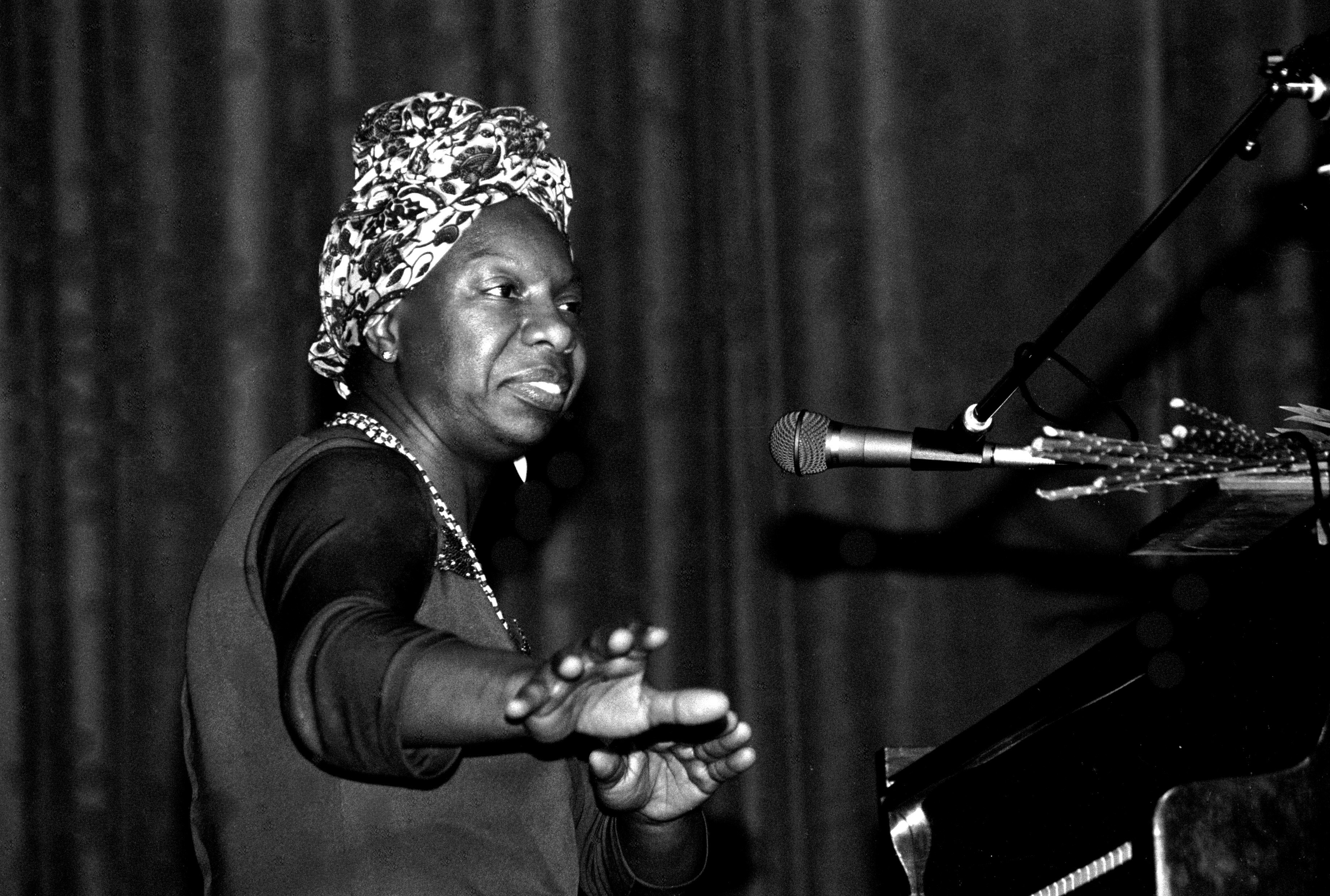
- Portrait of Nina Simone in concert in Morlaix, France during 1982
- Studio albums: 19
- Live albums: 14

Nina Simone (1933-2003) was an American composer, pianist, singer, songwriter, arranger and civil rights activist.

== Albums ==
This is a list of Simone's official albums, both studio and live, issued with her explicit co-operation.

List of albums, with selected information
Year	Title	Peak chart positions					Type	Label	Certifications
Year	Title	US	US R&B	US Jazz	NLD	UK	Type	Label	Certifications
1959	Little Girl Blue	―	―	―	―	―	Studio	Bethlehem Records	
1959	The Amazing Nina Simone	―	―	―	―	―	Studio	Colpix Records	
1959	Nina Simone at Town Hall	―	―	―	―	―	Live and studio	Colpix Records	
1960	Nina Simone at Newport	―	―	―	―	―	Live	Colpix Records	
1961	Forbidden Fruit	―	―	―	―	―	Studio	Colpix Records	
1962	Nina at the Village Gate	―	―	―	―	―	Live	Colpix Records	
1962	Nina Simone Sings Ellington	―	―	―	―	―	Studio	Colpix Records	
1963	Nina Simone at Carnegie Hall	―	―	―	―	―	Live	Colpix Records	
1964	Folksy Nina	―	―	―	―	―	Live	Colpix Records	
1964	Nina Simone in Concert	102	―	―	―	―	Live	Philips Records	
1964	Broadway-Blues-Ballads	―	―	―	―	―	Studio	Philips Records	
1965	I Put a Spell on You	99	―	10	―	18	Studio	Philips Records	
1965	Pastel Blues	139	8	18 (Note: 2020 reissue)	―	―	Studio	Philips Records	
1966	Let It All Out	―	19	―	―	―	Live and studio	Philips Records	
1966	Wild Is the Wind	110	12	―	―	―	Studio	Philips Records	
1967	High Priestess of Soul	―	29	―	―	―	Studio	Philips Records	
1967	Nina Simone Sings the Blues	―	29	37 (Note: 2006 reissue)	―	―	Studio	RCA Records	
1967	Silk & Soul	158	24	―	―	―	Studio	RCA Records	
1968	'Nuff Said!	―	44	―	8	11	Live and studio	RCA Records	
1969	Nina Simone and Piano	―	―	―	―	―	Studio	RCA Records	
1969	To Love Somebody	―	―	―	―	―	Studio	RCA Records	
1970	Black Gold	149	21	―	―	―	Live	RCA Records	
1971	Here Comes the Sun	190	―	―	―	―	Studio	RCA Records	ARIA: Gold
1972	Emergency Ward	―	―	―	―	―	Live and studio	RCA Records	
1974	It Is Finished	―	―	―	―	―	Live	RCA Records	
1978	Baltimore	―	―	―	―	―	Studio	CTI Records	
1982	Fodder on My Wings	―	―	22 (Note: 2020 reissue)	―	―	Studio	Carrere	
1985	Nina's Back	―	―	―	―	―	Studio	VPI	
1985	Live & Kickin	―	―	―	―	―	Live	VPI	
1987	Let It Be Me	―	―	―	―	―	Live	Verve	
1987	Live at Ronnie Scott's	―	―	―	―	―	Live	Hendring-Wadham	
1993	A Single Woman	―	―	19	―	―	Studio	Elektra Records	
"—" denotes releases that did not chart or were not released in that territory.

=== Additional album releases ===
List of albums, with selected information
Year	Title	Peak chart positions							Type	Label	Certifications
Year	Title	US	US R&B	US Jazz	AUS	FRA	NLD	UK	Type	Label	Certifications
1960	Nina Simone and Her Friends	―	―	―	―	―	―	―	Compilation - Studio (compilation with four tracks by Simone)	Bethlehem Records	
1963	Nina's Choice	―	―	―	―	―	―	―	Compilation	Colpix Records	
1964	Serenade of Soul	―	―	―	―	―	―	―	Demo 1956 (compilation with three tracks by Simone)	Almor	
1964	Starring Nina Simone	―	―	―	―	―	―	―	Demo 1956 (compilation with five tracks by Simone)	Spinorama	
1965	Sincerely Nina	―	―	―	―	―	―	―	Compilation - Studio & Live	Philips Records	
1966	Nina Simone with Strings	―	―	―	―	―	―	―	Compilation - Studio (strings added)	Colpix	
1970	Gifted & Black	―	―	―	―	―	―	―	Demo 1957 (strings added 1970)	Canyon Records (Stroud Productions)	
1970	The Best of Nina Simone	189	―	―	―	―	―	―	Compilation	RCA Records / BMG	
1972	Live in Europe	―	―	―	―	―	―	―	Live	Trip Records	
1972	Sings Billie Holiday – Lady Sings the Blues	―	―	―	―	―	―	―	Live	Stroud Recordings	
1973	Live at Berkeley	―	―	―	―	―	―	―	Live	Stroud Recordings	
1973	Gospel According to Nina Simone	―	―	―	―	―	―	―	Live	Stroud Recordings	
1974	Portrait of Nina	―	40	―	―	―	―	―	Compilation	Trip	
1977	Lamentations	―	―	―	―	―	―	―	Live	Versatile	
1979	A Very Rare Evening	―	―	―	―	―	―	―	Live	PM Records	
1984	Backlash	―	―	―	―	―	―	―	Live	StarJazz	
1987	My Baby Just Cares for Me	―	―	―	47	―	13	56	Reissue of Little Girl Blue	Charly Records	BPI: Gold; FRA: Gold
1987	The Nina Simone Collection	―	―	―	―	―	―	―	Compilation	Deja Vu	
1988	Don't Let Me Be Misunderstood	―	―	―	―	―	―	―	Compilation	Mercury	PMB: Platinum
1989	Nina Simone - Compact Jazz	―	―	―	―	―	―	―	Compilation	Mercury	
1992	The Best Of The Colpix Years	―	―	―	―	―	―	―	Compilation	Roulette / Blue Note / EMI	
1994	The Rising Sun Collection	―	―	―	―	―	―	―	Live	Enja	
1994	Verve Jazz Masters, Vol. 17	―	―	32	―	―	―	―	Compilation	PolyGram	
1994	The Essential Nina Simone, Vol. 2	―	―	41	―	―	―	―	Compilation	Sony Legacy	
1994	Feeling Good: The Very Best of Nina Simone	―	―	― (Note: Best Of did not enter the US Jazz Albums chart, but did peak at number 18 on the Traditional Jazz Albums.)	―	―	―	―	Compilation	Verve / Polygram TV	
1995	Nina Simone – Anthology (The Colpix Years)	―	―	―	―	―	―	―	Compilation	Rhino	
1996	After Hours	―	―	―	―	―	―	―	Compilation	Verve	
1997	Released	―	―	―	―	―	―	―	Compilation	RCA Victor Europe	ARIA: Gold
1997	Blue for You – The Very Best Of	―	―	―	―	―	―	12	Compilation	Global Television	
1997	Saga of the Good Life and Hard Times	―	―	―	―	―	―	―	Compilation	RCA	
1997	Ultimate Nina Simone	―	―	― (Note: Ultimate Simone did not enter the US Jazz Albums chart, but did peak at number 25 on the Traditional Jazz Albums.)	―	―	―	―	Compilation	Verve	
1998	I Got Life and Many Others	―	―	―	―	―	19	―	Compilation	RCA	
2000	Bittersweet: The Very Best of Nina Simone	―	―	― (Note: Bittersweet: The Very Best of Nina Simone did not enter the US Jazz Albums chart, but did peak at number 23 on the Traditional Jazz Albums.)	―	―	―	―	Compilation	House of Hits	
2003	Four Women: The Nina Simone Philips Recordings	―	―	―	―	―	―	―	Compilation	Verve	
2003	Gold	―	―	―	―	―	―	27	Compilation	Universal / UCJ	BPI: Gold; BVMI: Platinum
2003	Anthology	―	―	27	―	―	―	―	Compilation	RCA / BMG Heritage	
2003	The Diva Series: Nina Simone	―	―	― (Note: The Diva Series: Nina Simone did not enter the US Jazz Albums chart, but did peak at number 23 on the Traditional Jazz Albums.)	―	―	―	―	Compilation	Verve	
2004	Nina Simone's Finest Hour	―	―	― (Note: Nina Simone's Finest Hour did not enter the US Jazz Albums chart, but did peak at number 22 on the Traditional Jazz Albums.)	―	―	―		Compilation	Verve / Universal	
2004	Feeling Good: The Very Best of Nina Simone	―	―	―	―	―	―	9	Compilation	Verve / Polygram TV	BPI: Gold; BVMI: Gold
2005	The Soul of Nina Simone	―	―	― (Note: The Soul of Nina Simone did not enter the US Jazz Albums chart, but did peak at number 23 on the Traditional Jazz Albums.)	―	―	―	―	Compilation + DVD	RCA DualDisc	
2005	Nina Simone Live at Montreux 1976	―	―	―	―	―	―	―	DVD	Eagle Eye Media	
2005	Nina Simone Live	―	―	―	―	―	―	―	DVD	Kultur / Creative Arts Television	
2005	Love Songs	―	―	―	―	―	―	―	Compilation	Sony BMG	
2005	Jazz Biography Series	―	―	― (Note: Jazz Biography Series did not enter the US Jazz Albums chart, but did peak at number 23 on the Traditional Jazz Albums.)	―	―	―	―	Compilation	Universal	
2005	Nina Simone for Lovers	―	―	21	―	―	―	―	Compilation	Verve	
2006	The Very Best of Nina Simone	―	―	―	—	126	―	6	Compilation	Sony / BMG	BPI: 2× Platinum
2006	Remixed and Reimagined	―	―	11	―	―	―	―	Remix	RCA / Legacy / SME	
2006	Forever Young, Gifted, & Black: Songs of Freedom and Spirit	―	―	43	―	―	―	―	Remix	RCA / SME	
2006	Songs to Sing: the Best of Nina Simone	―	―	―	―	―	―	92	Compilation	Deluxe	BPI: Gold
2006	The Definitive Collection	―	―	28	―	―	―	―	Compilation	Hip-O	
2007	Just Like a Woman: Nina Simone Sings Classic Songs of the 60s	―	―	50	―	―	―	―	Compilation	Sony / Legacy / BMG	
2008	To Be Free: The Nina Simone Story	―	―	24	―	―	―	―	Compilation	Sony / Legacy / BMG	
2008	How It Feels to Be Free: Opus Collection	― (Note: How It Feels to Be Free: Opus Collection did not enter the Billboard 200, but did peak at number three on the Catalog Albums chart.)	―	―	―	―	―	―	Compilation	Sony	
2009	The Definitive Rarities Collection – 50 Classic Cuts	―	―	―	―	―	―	―	Compilation	Artwork Media	
2009	Friends/Family/French Lessons	―	―	17	―	―	―	―	Compilation	Stroud Recordings	
2011	The Essential Nina Simone	―	―	10	―	―	―	―	Compilation	Sony Legacy, RCA, BMG Heritage	
2011	S.O.U.L.: Nina Simone	―	―	16	―	―	―	―	Compilation	Sony Legacy	
2012	Greatest Hits	―	―	―	―	―	―	―	Compilation	Sinostate	
2013	Purple Fields	―	―	―	―	―	―	―	Compilation	Savage Rose	
2013	Feels Good	―	―	―	―	―	―	―	Compilation	Savage Rose	
2013	Shout Out Loud	―	―	―	―	―	―	―	Compilation	Savage Rose	
2014	Live in Germany 1989	―	―	―	―	―	―	―	Live	Immortal	
2014	See-Line Woman – The Best Of	―	―	―	―	―	―	―	Compilation	Spectrum	BPI: Silver
2015	La légende	―	―	―	―	82	―	―	Compilation	Sony	
2016	Portrait	―	―	―	―	―	―	―	Compilation	Warner Music / X5 Music Group	
2016	The Other Woman	―	―	―	―	―	―	―	Compilation	Awa	
2017	At High Altitude	―	―	―	―	―	―	―	Compilation	Cappo Digital	
2017	Mood Indigo: The Complete Bethlehem Singles	―	―	7	―	―	―	―	Compilation	Bethlehem / BMG	
2017	The Colpix Singles	―	―	―	―	―	―	―	Compilation	Rhino	
2017	Platinum Collection	―	―	―	―	―	―	―	Compilation	Not Now	
2017	Hits	―	―	―	―	―	―	―	Compilation	New Continent	
2018	7 Classic Albums	―	―	―	―	―	―	―	Box Set	Reel to Reel	
2020	Work from Home with Nina Simone	―	―	8	―	―	―	―	Compilation	UMG Recordings	
2020	Old Time Jazz	―	―	―	―	―	―	―	Compilation	Old Time Jazz	
2021	The Montreux Years	―	―	21	―	134	―	―	Compilation	BMG Right Management	
2022	Feeling Good: Her Greatest Hits and Remixes	―	―	4	―	―	―	―	Compilation	Verve Label Group	
"—" denotes releases that did not chart or were not released in that territory.

== Singles ==
Nina Simone's life as a recording artist can be divided into three phases: early period (1957–64, corresponding to her albums with Bethlehem and Colpix); middle period (1964–74, corresponding to her albums with Philips and RCA); and late period (1974–2003, corresponding to her time either without a recording contract or with a multitude of different contracts). Simone died in 2003, and all releases after this are posthumous.

=== Singles: Early period (1959–1964) ===
Year	Single (A-side, B-side) Both sides from same album except where indicated	Chart positions		Label	Album
Year	Single (A-side, B-side) Both sides from same album except where indicated	US	US R&B	Label	Album
1959	"I Loves You, Porgy" b/w "Love Me or Leave Me"	18	2	Bethlehem	Little Girl Blue (1959)
1959	"Chilly Winds Don't Blow" b/w "Solitaire"	—	—	Colpix	The Amazing Nina Simone
1959	"Children Go Where I Send You" b/w "Willow Weep for Me"	—	—	Colpix	The Amazing Nina Simone
1959	"He Needs Me" b/w "Little Girl Blue"	—	—	Bethlehem	Little Girl Blue
1959	"Don't Smoke in Bed" b/w "African Mailman" (from Nina Simone and Her Friends)	—	—	Bethlehem	Little Girl Blue
1959	"The Other Woman" b/w "It Might as Well Be Spring" (from The Amazing Nina Simone)	—	—	Colpix	Nina Simone at Town Hall
1960	"Mood Indigo" b/w "Central Park Blues"	—	—	Bethlehem	Little Girl Blue
1960	"For All We Know" b/w "Good Bait" (from Little Girl Blue)	—	—	Bethlehem	Nina Simone and Her Friends
1960	"Summertime" (Live - Part II Vocal) b/w "Fine and Mellow"	—	—	Colpix	Nina Simone at Town Hall
1960	"You'll Never Walk Alone" b/w "Plain Gold Ring"	—	—	Bethlehem	Little Girl Blue
1960	"Since My Love Has Gone" b/w "Tomorrow (We Shall Meet Once More)" (from The Amazing Nina Simone)	—	—	Colpix	Non-album track
1960	"Central Park" b/w "He's Got the Whole World in His Hands" (from Nina Simone and Her Friends)	—	—	Bethlehem	Little Girl Blue
1960	"If Only for Tonight" b/w "Under the Lowest" (from Nina Simone at Town Hall)	—	—	Colpix	Non-album track
1960	"Nobody Knows You When You're Down and Out" b/w "Black Is the Color of My True Love's Hair" (from Nina Simone at Town Hall)	93	23	Colpix	Non-album track
1960	"Trouble in Mind" b/w "Cotton Eye Joe" (from At Town Hall)	92	11	Colpix	Nina at Newport
1961	"Work Song" b/w "Memphis in June"	—	—	Colpix	Forbidden Fruit
1961	"Gin House Blues" b/w "You Can Have Him" (from Nina Simone at Town Hall)	113	—	Colpix	Forbidden Fruit
1961	"Come on Back, Jack" b/w "You've Been Gone Too Long" (from The Amazing Nina Simone)	—	—	Colpix	Non-album track
1962	"In the Evening by the Moonlight" b/w "Chilly Winds Don't Blow" (from The Amazing Nina Simone)	—	—	Colpix	Nina at Newport
1962	"I Got It Bad" b/w "I Want a Little Sugar in My Bowl" (Non-album track)	—	—	Colpix	Nina Simone Sings Ellington
1962	"My Baby Just Cares for Me" b/w "He Needs Me"	—	—	Bethlehem	Little Girl Blue
1963	"Little Liza Jane" b/w "Blackbird" (Non-album track)	—	—	Colpix	Nina at Newport
"—" denotes releases that did not chart or were not released in that territory.

Colpix Torchlite Series singles

Simone's official final single for Colpix was "Little Liza Jane" in September 1963, as she then moved from that company to a new contract with Philips. However, later that year, Colpix released thirteen 7" singles all at the same time from Simone under a special imprint called the Colpix Torchlite Series.

Year	Single (A-side, B-side) Both sides from same album except where indicated	Album
1963	"Work Song" b/w "Gin House Blues"	Forbidden Fruit
1963	"Where Can I Go Without You" b/w "Memphis in June"	Forbidden Fruit
1963	"Summertime" (Part II – vocal; live) b/w "Cotton Eyed Joe" (Studio)	Nina Simone at Town Hall
1963	"Exactly Like You" b/w "Fine and Mellow"	Nina Simone at Town Hall
1963	"Do Nothin' Till You Hear from Me" b/w "Hey, Buddy Bolen"	Nina Simone Sings Ellington
1963	"Merry Mending" b/w "Something to Live For"	Nina Simone Sings Ellington
1963	"I Like the Sunrise" b/w "You Better Know It"	Nina Simone Sings Ellington
1963	"The Gal from Joe's" b/w "It Don't Mean a Thing"	Nina Simone Sings Ellington
1963	"Children Go Where I Send You" b/w "Tomorrow (We Shall Meet Once More)"	The Amazing Nina Simone
1963	"You've Been Gone Too Long" b/w "Stompin' at the Savoy"	The Amazing Nina Simone
1963	"That's Him Over There" b/w "Chilly Winds Don't Blow"	The Amazing Nina Simone
1963	"I Can't Get Out of This Mood" b/w "Willow Weep for Me"	The Amazing Nina Simone
1963	"Trouble in Mind" (Short Version) b/w "You Can Have Him" (from Nina Simone at Town Hall)	Nina Simone at Newport

=== Singles: Middle period (1964–1974) ===
Year	Single (A-side, B-side) Both sides from same album except where indicated	Chart positions			Certifications	Album
Year	Single (A-side, B-side) Both sides from same album except where indicated	US	US R&B	UK	Certifications	Album
1964	"I Loves You, Porgy" b/w "Old Jim Crow" (Non-album track)	—	—	—		The Best of Nina Simone
1964	"Mississippi *@!!?*@!" b/w "Sea Lion Woman" (from Broadway-Blues-Ballads)	—	—	—		The Best of Nina Simone
1964	"Don't Let Me Be Misunderstood" b/w "A Monster" (Non-album track)	131	—	—		Broadway-Blues-Ballads
1965	"I Am Blessed" b/w "How Can I"	—	—	—		Broadway-Blues-Ballads
1965	"I Put a Spell on You" b/w "Gimme Some"	120	23	49	BPI: Silver	I Put a Spell on You
1965	"Either Way I Lose" b/w "Break Down and Let It All Out"	—	—	—		Wild Is the Wind
1966	"Why Keep on Breaking My Heart" b/w "I Love Your Lovin' Ways"	—	—	—		Wild Is the Wind
1966	"I Love You've Lovin' Ways" b/w "See-Line Woman" (from Broadway-Blues-Ballads)	—	—	—		Wild Is the Wind
1966	"Four Women" b/w "What More Can I Say"	—	—	—		Wild Is the Wind
1966	"Don't You Pay Them No Mind" b/w "I'm Gonna Leave You"	—	—	—		High Priestess of Soul
1967	"Day and Night" b/w "Do I Move You"	—	—	—		Nina Simone Sings the Blues
1967	"You'll Go to Hell" b/w "It Be's That Way Sometimes"	133	—	—		Silk & Soul
1967	"I Wish I Knew" b/w "Cherish"	—	—	—		Silk & Soul
1968	"To Love Somebody" b/w "I Can't See Nobody"	—	—	5		To Love Somebody
1968	"Why? (The King of Love Is Dead)"—Part 1 b/w Part 2	—	—	—		'Nuff Said!
1968	"Ain't Got No, I Got Life" b/w "Real Real" (from Nina Simone Sings the Blues)	94 (1969)	—	2		'Nuff Said!
1968	"Do What You Gotta Do" b/w "Peace of Mind"	83	43	2		'Nuff Said!
1969	"I Put a Spell on You" b/w "Don't Let Me Be Misunderstood" (from Broadway-Blues-Ballads); Reissue	—	—	28		I Put a Spell on You
1969	"Revolution"—Part 1 b/w Part 2	—	41	—		To Love Somebody
1969	"Suzanne" b/w "Turn Turn Turn"	—	—	—		To Love Somebody
1969	"To Be Young, Gifted and Black" b/w "Save Me" (Non-album track)	76	8	—		Black Gold
1970	"I Loves You Porgy" b/w "My Baby Just Cares for Me"; A-side reissue of 1959 recording	—	—	—		Little Girl Blue
1970	"Who Knows Where the Time Goes" b/w "Assignment Song"	—	—	—		Black Gold
1970	"Whatever I Am" b/w "Why Must Your Love Well Be So Dry"	—	—	—		Non-album tracks
1971	"O-O-H Child" b/w "New World Coming"	—	—	—		Here Comes the Sun
1971	"Here Comes the Sun" b/w "Angel of the Morning"	—	—	—		Here Comes the Sun
1973	"Anytime, Anywhere" b/w "Sunday in Savannah"	—	—	—		Gospel According to Nina Simone
1973	"No Opportunity Necessary, No Experience Needed" b/w "The Assignment Song"	—	—	—		Live at Berkeley
1973	"My Sweet Lord"/"Today Is a Killer" b/w "Poppies"	—	—	—		Emergency Ward!
"—" denotes releases that did not chart or were not released in that territory.

=== Singles: Late period (1974–2003) ===
Year	Single (A-side, B-side) Both sides from same album except where indicated	Chart positions	Certifications	Album
Year	Single (A-side, B-side) Both sides from same album except where indicated	UK	Certifications	Album
1978	"Baltimore" b/w "Forget"	—		Baltimore
1979	"The Family" b/w "That's All I Want from You"	—		Baltimore
1987	"My Baby Just Cares for Me" b/w "Little Girl Blue"; Original 1958/1959 recordings	5	BPI: Silver	Little Girl Blue
1988	"Mr Bojangles" b/w "Turn Me On"/"Ain't Got No - I Got Life"; Original 1967-9 recordings	96		The Artistry of Nina Simone
1994	"Feeling Good" (Original 1965 recording) b/w "My Baby Just Cares for Me" (live, non-album track)	40	RIAA: 2× Platinum; BPI: Platinum	Feeling Good - The Very Best of Nina Simone
"—" denotes releases that did not chart or were not released in that territory.

=== Singles: Posthumous (2003 onward) ===
Year	Single (A-side, B-side) Both sides from same album except where indicated	Certifications	Album
2003	"Sinnerman"; CD single with four different versions	BPI: Silver	Four Women – The Nina Simone Philips Recordings

- a remix of "Ain't Got No, I Got Life" credited to Nina Simone V Groovefinder reached number 30 on the UK Singles Chart in 2006.
