= Nina Simone Sings the Blues =

Studio album by Nina Simone
- Released: June 1967 (Note: Some sources date the release to it releasing sometime in June, 1967, because it was in 1967 that Simone was signed to RCA Victor. Many Nina Simone discographies and biographies also do often cite June as its release month based on archival research and record company documents)
- Recorded: December 19, 1966 – January 5, 1967
- Studios: RCA Victor, New York City, New York
- Genres: Blues, soul, jazz, pop, folk
- Length: 32:35
- Label: RCA Victor
- Producer: Danny Davis

Nina Simone chronology
High Priestess of Soul (1967)	Nina Simone Sings the Blues (1967)	Silk & Soul (1967)

Professional ratings
Review scores
Source	Rating
AllMusic	5/5 stars
All About Jazz	4/5 stars
Entertainment Weekly	A−
PopMatters	7/10
Tom Hull	B
Encyclopedia of Popular Music	4/5 stars

Nina Simone Sings the Blues is the tenth full studio album by American singer-songwriter and musician Nina Simone. This was Simone's first album for RCA Victor after previously recording for Colpix Records and Philips Records. The album was also reissued in 2006 with bonus tracks, and reissued in 1991 by RCA/Novus as a 17-track compilation under the title The Blues.

== Song information ==
- "My Man's Gone Now," from the opera Porgy & Bess by George Gershwin.
- "Backlash Blues," one of Simone's civil rights songs. The lyrics were written by her friend, poet Langston Hughes.
- "I Want a Little Sugar in My Bowl," based on a song by Bessie Smith, but with somewhat different lyrics.
- "The House of the Rising Sun" was previously recorded live by Simone in 1962 on Nina at the Village Gate. After its cover by The Animals became a hit, she recorded it in studio. The fast-paced version on this album is very different from the slow, intimate version on Nina at the Village Gate.

== Legacy ==
Musicians Beth Orton, Marissa Nadler, and Tanita Tikaram have named Blues among their favorite albums. In 2017, Blues placed #28 on NPR Music's list "The 150 Greatest Albums Made By Women".

== Track listing ==
No.	Title	Writer(s)	Length
1.	"Do I Move You?"	Nina Simone	2:46
2.	"Day and Night"	Rudy Stevenson	2:35
3.	"In the Dark"	Lil Green	2:57
4.	"Real Real"	Nina Simone	2:21
5.	"My Man's Gone Now"	George Gershwin, DuBose Heyward	4:16
6.	"Backlash Blues"	Langston Hughes, Nina Simone	2:31
7.	"I Want a Little Sugar in My Bowl"	Nina Simone	2:32
8.	"Buck"	Andy Stroud	1:52
9.	"Since I Fell for You"	Buddy Johnson	2:52
10.	"The House of the Rising Sun"	Traditional	3:53
11.	"Blues for Mama"	Nina Simone, Abbey Lincoln	4:00

Bonus tracks on 2006 reissue
No.	Title	Writer(s)	Length
12.	"Do I Move You?" (Second version)	Nina Simone	2:17
13.	"Whatever I Am"	Willie Dixon	2:35

Additional tracks on The Blues (1991)
No.	Title	Writer(s)	Length
12.	"The Pusher" (from It Is Finished)	Hoyt Axton	4:50
13.	"Turn Me On" (from Silk & Soul)	John D. Loudermilk	2:24
14.	"It's Nobody's Fault But Mine" (from Nina Simone and Piano)	Blind Willie Johnson	2:59
15.	"Go to Hell" (from Silk & Soul)	Morris Bailey, Jr.	2:46
16.	"I Shall Be Released" (from To Love Somebody)	Bob Dylan	3:51
17.	"Gin House Blues" (from 'Nuff Said!)	Fletcher Henderson, Henry Troy	3:08

== Personnel ==
Tracks 1–12

- Nina Simone - vocals, piano
- Eric Gale, Rudy Stevenson - guitar
- Ernie Hayes - organ
- Bob Bushnell - bass guitar
- Bernard Purdie - drums, timpani
- Buddy Lucas - harmonica, tenor saxophone

Track 13

- Nina Simone - vocals, piano
- Everett Barksdale, Eric Gale - guitar
- Weldon Irvine, Richard Tee - organ
- Jerry Jemmott - bass guitar
- probably Bernard Purdie - drums
- Specs Powell - vibes, percussion
- George Devens, Montego Joe - percussion
- Joe Shepley, Jimmy Nottingham, Harold Johnson, Wilbur Bascomb - trumpet
- Jimmy Cleveland, Richard Harris - trombone
- Seldon Powell, George Coleman, Norris Turney, Haywood Henry - saxophone
- Ralph H. Fields, Eileen Gilbert, Jerome Graff, Milt Grayson, Hilda Harris, Noah Hopkins, Maeretha Stewart, Barbara Webb - vocals
- Arranged and conducted by Weldon Irvine

== Charts ==
Chart (1967)	Peak position
US Hot R&B LPs	29
Chart (2006)	Peak position
US Jazz Albums	37
