= High Priestess of Soul =

Studio album by Nina Simone
- Released: 1967
- Recorded: New York, 1965–1966
- Genres: Jazz, blues, folk, R&B
- Length: 35:51
- Label: Philips
- Producer: Hal Mooney

Nina Simone chronology
Wild Is the Wind (1966)	High Priestess of Soul (1967)	Nina Simone Sings the Blues (1967)

Professional ratings
Review scores
Source	Rating
Allmusic	5/5 stars
Encyclopedia of Popular Music	4/5 stars
Pitchfork	9.2/10

High Priestess of Soul is the ninth full studio album by American singer-songwriter Nina Simone. The songs are accompanied by a large band directed and arranged by Hal Mooney. The album contains pop songs (such as "Don't You Pay Them No Mind") and African American gospel and folk-related songs written by Simone herself (such as "Take Me to the Water" and "Come Ye"). After this album title – an attempt to broaden her appeal by management execs – Nina Simone was sometimes titled “the high priestess of soul”, although she completely rejected the title herself because it placed a label on her as an artist. However, according to her daughter, Lisa, she never hated that moniker.

== Information about songs on this album ==
- The songs "I Hold No Grudge" and "He Ain't Comin' Home No More" were co-written by Andy Badale, the pseudonym of Angelo Badalamenti, who later became known as the composer of the soundtracks for the films of David Lynch. Simone recorded also "Another Spring" by Badalamenti and Clifford for her album Nina Simone and Piano released 1969.
- An earlier recording of the soul-jazz hit "Work Song" by Nat Adderley and Oscar Brown, Jr. had been featured on Forbidden Fruit (1961, also featured on the compilation Nina’s Choice from 1963). In 1966, two years after her departure from Colpix, the same recording from the Forbidden Fruit sessions was featured again, but with strings added, on With Strings.
- The last track "I Love My Baby" is a composition by Andy Stroud to whom Simone was married from 1960 until 1970. His company Stroud Productions also produced many of her albums.

== Track listing ==
Side One
No.	Title	Writer(s)	Length
1.	"Don't You Pay Them No Mind"	Richard Ahlert, Bobby Scott	3:05
2.	"I'm Gonna Leave You"	Rudy Stevenson	2:15
3.	"Brown Eyed Handsome Man"	Chuck Berry	2:02
4.	"Keeper of the Flame"	Charles Derringer	3:21
5.	"The Gal from Joe's"	Duke Ellington, Irving Mills	2:43
6.	"Take Me to the Water"	Nina Simone	2:49

Side Two
No.	Title	Writer(s)	Length
7.	"I'm Going Back Home"	Stevenson	2:47
8.	"I Hold No Grudge"	Angelo Badalamenti, John Clifford	2:17
9.	"Come Ye"	Simone	3:34
10.	"He Ain't Comin' Home No More"	Angelo Badalamenti, Clifford	3:06
11.	"Work Song"	Nat Adderley, Oscar Brown	3:03
12.	"I Love My Baby"	Andy Stroud	4:00

== Charts ==
Chart 1967	Peak position
Hot R&B LPs	29
