= Forbidden Fruit (Nina Simone album) =

Studio album by Nina Simone
- Released: 1961
- Recorded: 1960–1961
- Studio: New York City
- Genre: Jazz, blues, folk
- Length: 37:57
- Label: Colpix
- Producer: Cal Lampley

Nina Simone chronology
Nina Simone at Newport (1960)	Forbidden Fruit (1961)	Nina at the Village Gate (1962)

Forbidden Fruit is the third studio album by Nina Simone. It was her second studio album for Colpix. The rhythm section accompanying her is the same trio as on both live albums before and after this release.

== Song information ==
- "Gin House Blues", Simone re-recorded this song in a more upbeat way on 'Nuff Said! (1968).
- "Work Song", written by Oscar Brown, Jr and Nat Adderley tells the story of a chain gang. This song also appears on Nina’s Choice (1963), Nina Simone with Strings (1966) and, newly recorded, on High Priestess of Soul (1967).
- "Forbidden Fruit", the title song, one of three on the album by Oscar Brown, Jr. This "humorous up-tempo take on Adam and Eve was part nursery rhyme, part call and response."

== Reception ==
Professional ratings
Review scores
Source	Rating
DownBeat	3/5 stars

The contemporaneous DownBeat reviewer commented that Forbidden Fruit was not a jazz album, but added that "Simone demonstrates here that she has the equipment and some of the potential to be a fairly good jazz vocalist".

== Track listing ==
No.	Title	Lyrics	Music	Length
1.	"Rags and Old Iron"	Oscar Brown, Jr	Norman Curtis
2.	"No Good Man"		Dan Fisher, Irene Higginbotham, Sammy Gallop
3.	"Gin House Blues"	Henry Troy	Fletcher Henderson
4.	"I'll Look Around"	Douglas Cross	George C. Cory
5.	"I Love to Love"	Herbert Baker	Lennie Hayton
6.	"Work Song"	Oscar Brown, Jr	Nat Adderley
7.	"Where Can I Go Without You?"	Peggy Lee	Victor Young
8.	"Just Say I Love Him"	Enzo Fusco; English lyrics: Sam Ward and Martin Kalmanoff	Rodolfo Falvo; Music adaptation: Jack Val and Jimmy Dale
9.	"Memphis in June"	Paul Francis Webster	Hoagy Carmichael
10.	"Forbidden Fruit"		Oscar Brown, Jr
Total length:				37:57

The 2005 CD version by EMI features 11 bonus tracks roughly recorded at the same time, themselves adding up to a kind of "lost album" of approximately 40 minutes. Four of the songs - Porgy, I Is Your Woman Now, Baubles, Bangles and Beads, Gimme a Pigfoot (a different take), and Spring Is Here - were previously issued on Nina Simone with Strings in edited form with an overdubbed string section.

2005 CD version
No.	Title	Lyrics	Music	Length
1.	"Porgy, I Is Your Woman Now"	DuBose Heyward, Ira Gershwin	George Gershwin
2.	"Baubles, Bangles and Beads"		Robert Wright, George Forrest
3.	"Gimme a Pigfoot"		Wesley Wilson
4.	"Ev'rytime We Say Goodbye"		Cole Porter
5.	"Spring Is Here"	Lorenz Hart	Richard Rodgers
6.	"Lonesome Valley" (traditional)
7.	"Golden Earrings"	Ray Evans	Jay Livingston, Victor Young
8.	"My Ship"	Ira Gershwin	Kurt Weill
9.	"'Tain't Nobody's Biz-ness if I Do"		Porter Grainger, Robert Graham Prince, Clarence Williams, Everett Robbins
10.	"Try a Little Tenderness"		Harry M. Woods, Jimmy Campbell, Reg Connelly
11.	"Od Yesh Homa" (traditional)

== Personnel ==
- Nina Simone – vocals, piano
- Al Schackman – guitar
- Chris White – bass
- Bobby Hamilton – drums
