= Sinner Man (disambiguation) =

"Sinner Man" is an American traditional spiritual song.

Sinner Man or Sinnerman may also refer to:

- "Sinner Man", a song by Trini Lopez from All My Best
- "Sinner Man (Don't Let Him Catch You)", a funk/soul song by Valerie Simpson from her 1971 album Exposed
- "Sinner Man", a 1979 disco song by Sarah Dash
- Paul Sinha, nicknamed "The Sinnerman" on the quiz show The Chase
