= To Love Somebody (album) =

Studio album by Nina Simone
- Released: 1969
- Recorded: 1967–69
- Studio: RCA (New York City)
- Genres: Jazz; blues; pop; folk
- Length: 32:48
- Label: RCA Victor
- Producers: Danny Davis; Andrew Stroud

Nina Simone chronology
Nina Simone and Piano (1969)	To Love Somebody (1969)	Black Gold (1970)

Professional ratings
Review scores
Source	Rating
AllMusic	3/5 stars

To Love Somebody is an album by jazz singer-songwriter/pianist Nina Simone. Primarily a covers album, it was released as quickly as possible to prolong the unexpected success of 'Nuff Said! The title is taken from the Bee Gees song "To Love Somebody"; her cover of the song became her second British hit single after "Ain't Got No, I Got Life".

== Tracks ==
"Revolution" is the only original song written for the album. It was Simone's third subsequent single released in the UK after "Ain't Got No, I Got Life" and "To Love Somebody" both became hits. The song was released around the time of the same titled song by the Beatles and, although it has a similar hook ("Don't you know it's gonna be – all right") and structure, most of the lyrics differ. The song also uses a guitar lick similar to "Old Brown Shoe," which had been recorded by the Beatles the same year. John Lennon commented on the similarities in a 1971 interview with Rolling Stone:

I thought it was interesting that Nina Simone did a sort of answer to "Revolution." That was very good–it was sort of like "Revolution," but not quite. That I sort of enjoyed, somebody who reacted immediately to what I had said.

The song is split into two parts as a result of the single release. "Revolution" didn't do well in the UK charts, and only had a mild success in the United States R&B charts. Simone was surprised by this and said to Sylvia Hampton, author of the biography Break Down and Let It All Out about this:

I don't get it. It's about a revolution, man: not just colour, but everything! It's about barriers being broken down, and they sure as hell need getting rid of. [...] We need a revolution to sort it all out and get back to God. You know how lost we are, man – it's sad.

Simone also recorded an alternate version of "Turn! Turn! Turn!" that was (previously) unreleased.

== Track listing ==
No.	Title	Writer(s)	Length
1.	"Suzanne"	Leonard Cohen	4:21
2.	"Turn! Turn! Turn! (To Everything There Is a Season)"	Traditional, Pete Seeger	3:41
3.	"Revolution (Part 1)"	Weldon Irvine, Simone	2:53
4.	"Revolution (Part 2)"	Weldon Irvine, Simone	1:54
5.	"To Love Somebody"	Barry Gibb, Robin Gibb	2:42
6.	"I Shall Be Released"	Bob Dylan	3:55
7.	"I Can't See Nobody"	Barry Gibb, Robin Gibb	3:10
8.	"Just Like Tom Thumb's Blues"	Bob Dylan	4:52
9.	"The Times They Are a-Changin'"	Bob Dylan	6:00
Total length:			32:48

== Personnel ==
- Nina Simone – vocals, piano, arrangements
- Don Alias – drums
- Weldon J. Irvine – organ
- Al Schackman – guitar
- Gene A. Perla – Fender bass
- Doris Willingham – vocals
- Virdia Crawford – vocals
- Jimmy Wisner – arrangements, conductor on "To Love Somebody" and "I Can't See Nobody"

Technical

- Mike Moran, Ray Hall – recording engineers
