= I Put a Spell on You (disambiguation) =

"I Put a Spell on You" is a 1956 song by Screamin' Jay Hawkins.

I Put a Spell on You may also refer to:

- I Put a Spell on You (album), a 1965 album by Nina Simone
- I Put a Spell on You (book), a 1992 autobiography by Nina Simone
- I Put a Spell on You, a 2008 young-adult novel by Adam Selzer
