= Revolution (Nina Simone song) =

Single by Nina Simone

from the album To Love Somebody
- A-side: "Revolution (Part 1)"
- B-side: "Revolution (Part 2)"
- Released: 1969
- Recorded: RCA studios, New York City
- Genre: Pop
- Length: 2:53
- Label: RCA Records
- Songwriter(s): Nina Simone, Weldon Irvine

"Revolution" is a 1969 answer song by the American jazz musician Nina Simone and Weldon Irvine. It was released as a single in 1969 and on the album To Love Somebody in 1969. The single release was split over two sides of a 45 rpm disc and these two edits were used as separate tracks on the album. The song was released the year after the Beatles' "Revolution", and is a variation of that song. "Revolution" didn't do as well as expected and Simone has expressed surprise and disappointment at its lack of success.
