= Pastel Blues =

Studio album by Nina Simone
- Released: October 1, 1965
- Recorded: 1964–1965
- Length: 35:02
- Label: Philips
- Producer: Hal Mooney

Nina Simone chronology
I Put a Spell on You (1965)	Pastel Blues (1965)	Let It All Out (1966)

Pastel Blues is the seventh full studio album by American singer Nina Simone, released on October 1, 1965, by Philips Records.

The album was recorded in 1964 and 1965 in New York City and peaked at number 139 on the Billboard 200 chart, as well as number 8 on the Hot R&B LPs chart. The album was re-issued in November 2020 by Verve and Universal Music Enterprises as part of their "audiophile-grade" Acoustic Sounds series.

In 2017, Pitchfork placed the album at number 21 on its list of the best albums of the 1960s.

== Music and lyrics ==
Marc Hogan of Pitchfork explained: "Nina Simone was a Juilliard-trained classical pianist and a preternaturally adroit interpreter of jazz, folk, and pop, but in 1965, she was singing the blues. In January, Simone's friend Lorraine Hansberry, who wrote A Raisin in the Sun, died from cancer; in February, on Simone's 32nd birthday, her friend Malcolm X was assassinated. Within weeks, Simone was performing during the Selma-to-Montgomery march and warning Martin Luther King, Jr., 'I'm not nonviolent.' Simone's pain hangs all over Pastel Blues, which brilliantly reaffirms that the blues isn't only a music of rural pathos but also of urban protest."

== Critical reception ==
Professional ratings
Review scores
Source	Rating
AllMusic	3.5/5 stars
Pitchfork	8.7/10
Record Mirror	4/5 stars
Tom Hull	B+

Richie Unterberger of AllMusic gave the album 3.5 stars out of 5 and called it "one of Nina Simone's more subdued mid-'60s LPs, putting the emphasis on her piano rather than band arrangements." He added, "By far the most impressive track is her frantic ten-minute rendition of the traditional 'Sinnerman,' an explosive tour de force that dwarfs everything else on the album."

Joe Muggs of Noisey said, "This is the blues as both urban and urbane, delivered with full knowledge of and passion for its history, and with all the guts and power that white rockers could ever muster, but with all the finesse, sophistication and abstraction that her Juilliard classical training could bring to bear on it."

In 2008, Cokemachineglow included it on the "30 'Other' Albums of the 1960s" list. In 2012, Alicia Keys included it on her "25 Favorite Albums" list. In 2017, Pitchfork placed it at number 21 on the "200 Best Albums of the 1960s" list.

== Track listing ==
Side one
No.	Title	Writer(s)	Length
1.	"Be My Husband"	Andy Stroud	3:19
2.	"Nobody Knows You When You're Down and Out"	Jimmy Cox	2:35
3.	"End of the Line"	John Edmondson, Cynthia Medley	2:51
4.	"Trouble in Mind"	Richard Jones	2:37
5.	"Tell Me More and More and Then Some"	Billie Holiday	3:05
6.	"Chilly Winds Don't Blow"	Hermann Krasnow, William Lovelock	3:59

Side two
No.	Title	Writer(s)	Length
7.	"Ain't No Use"	Rudy Stevenson	2:55
8.	"Strange Fruit"	Lewis Allan	3:26
9.	"Sinnerman"	Traditional; arranged by Nina Simone	10:15
Total length:			35:02

== Personnel ==
Credits adapted from liner notes.

- Nina Simone – piano, vocals, arrangement
- Al Schackman – guitar, harmonica
- Rudy Stevenson – guitar, flute
- Lisle Atkinson – double bass
- Bobby Hamilton – drums

== Charts ==
Chart (1965)	Peak position
US Billboard 200	139
US Hot R&B LPs (Billboard)	8
Chart (2020)	Peak position
US Jazz Albums (Billboard)	18
