= Nina Simone Sings Ellington =

1962 studio album by Nina Simone

Studio album by Nina Simone
- Released: 1962
- Recorded: New York City, 1961
- Genre: Vocal, jazz, blues, folk
- Length: 32:22
- Label: Colpix SCP 425, mono: CP 425
- Producer: Stu Philips

Nina Simone chronology
Nina at the Village Gate (1962)	Nina Simone Sings Ellington (1962)	Nina’s Choice (1963)

Professional ratings
Review scores
Source	Rating
AllMusic	3.5/5 stars
Tom Hull	B+

Nina Simone Sings Ellington is the fourth studio album by American singer and pianist Nina Simone, released in 1962. The album features songs that were recorded by Duke Ellington. Most were composed or cowritten by Ellington, some with his longtime collaborators Irving Mills and Billy Strayhorn.

Besides singing and playing piano on the album, Simone arranged the performances. She is accompanied on the album by the Malcolm Dodds Singers.

== About the cover ==
The cover photo features Simone's head in full color. In her 1992 autobiography, I Put a Spell on You, Simone wrote that the photo was a full-sized picture of Simone's body. However, because she was pregnant with her daughter Lisa at that time, the photographer tried various positions to hide Nina's stomach. He failed in this most probably, and that is why only Simone's head was featured on the cover.

A leftover shot of Nina from this session, featuring a pose from her chest up, was later used on her 1966 album, Nina Simone with Strings.

== Track listing ==
1. "Do Nothin' Till You Hear from Me" (Bob Russell) - 2:50
2. "I Got It Bad (And That Ain't Good)" (Paul Francis Webster) - 4:06
3. "Hey, Buddy Bolden" (Billy Strayhorn) - 2:28
4. "Merry Mending" - 2:35
5. "Something to Live For" (Strayhorn) - 2:55
6. "You Better Know It" - 2:24
7. "I Like the Sunrise" - 3:01
8. "Solitude" (Eddie DeLange, Irving Mills) - 3:45
9. "The Gal from Joe's" (Mills) - 2:08
10. "Satin Doll" (instrumental) (Johnny Mercer, Strayhorn) - 3:37
11. "It Don't Mean a Thing (If It Ain't Got That Swing)" (Mills) - 2:33

All songs composed by Duke Ellington, lyricists and co-composers indicated.
