= Human Kindness Day =

Human Kindness Day was a day of events held in Washington, D.C. in late spring from 1972 to 1975 to celebrate local artists and national performers "who have added to humanity and national community togetherness." It was the culmination of a month-long celebration organized by Compared to What? Inc. (a non-profit that helped meet community needs that could be exposed and addressed through the arts), along with the National Park Service and DC Recreation. Human Kindness Day took place within the context of the new District of Columbia home rule, which shifted the District of Columbia from Congressional rule to democracy with an elected mayor, Council, and small-scale Advisory Neighborhood Commissions.

== Activities ==
The month-long celebration opened with art and writing contests involving the school system (grades 7-12), focusing on the meaning of Human Kindness. On Human Kindness Day, there was a prayer breakfast, a run through the city, award ceremonies for student winners of the art and writing contests, and an afternoon concert by the year's honoree joined by other national and local artists at the Washington Monument on the National Mall.

The first Human Kindness Day was held in 1972 to honor the singer Roberta Flack, who had graduated from Washington's Howard University, had taught music in the DC Public Schools, sang in DC jazz clubs, and was Downbeat Magazine's #1 female vocalist of 1971. The 1972 concert on the National Mall drew 25,000 people and included many performers in addition to Roberta Flack: Archie Stewart, Bill Seigman, Donal Leace, Mr. Rhythm, Frank Bullard, Drop of Blue, Lorraine Rudolph, the New Generation, Zulu Nation, the Colmanaires, the Mighty Wonders, Calvert Crusaders, Flying Nesbits, Capitol Ballet Company, Ebony Impromptu Company, 3rd World Revolution, and Wayne Davis Company.

The 1973 event honored Dick Gregory, and the concert -- which included Rare Funk Ghetto, Staple Singers, Fat City, and Sea Train -- drew 35,000. The Evening Star called it "A summer-like day of delight."

The 1974 event honored Nina Simone. Along with Nina Simone, the Pointer Sisters, Herbie Hancock, New Birth, Darren Greene, Sir Joe, and the Free Souls performed for a crowd of 55,000 people.

The 1975 Human Kindness Day was held on the National Mall, with Stevie Wonder as the honoree and headlining act, and was attended by approximately 125,000 people. “One of the motivations for Stevie [Wonder] was a political one,” one of the organizers, Carol Kirkendall, told the Washington Post, “He was motivated to change the world and to fight the injustices of how young black people were being raised in the city. He knew what the arts could mean to those young people.” During those years, Wonder also was urging lawmakers to honor the memory of the late Martin Luther King Jr. by establishing a national holiday in King’s name. He knew that high-profile concerts in Washington would help that cause. Other entertainers were Lionel Richie and the Commodores along with Graham Central Station, featuring Larry Graham, late of Sly and the Family Stone.

== Media Representations ==
The media has focused on crime and violence at the 1974 and 1975 concerts. In 1974, the Washington Post reported 24 arrests for robbery and assault. In 1975, nearby the concert, the National Park Service recorded 500 incidents of robbery. The Washington Post noted that some 600 people were injured and 211 robbed. The Chicago Tribune noted that 150 people were hospitalized, including one who lost an eye. Amidst the violence, the Metropolitan Police and Park Police arrested only 32 people. One contributing factor in the violence is that the event organizers had arranged non-interference with law enforcement, promising to self-police with 800 volunteer marshals, of whom only 262 were working the event. After her concert in 1974, Nina Simone said, "Human Kindness Day was a counterpoint to everything that's bad, to the ugliness in this country. To me the day was incredibly beautiful. All the reports of violence were blown out of proportion, when you look at the whole day. And have people forgotten Altamont and Woodstock? What was said about Human Kindness Day was all vicious...it was vicious."

Nearby the concerts were groups acting in opposition to the Human Kindness Day ideal. At the 1973 concert, journalist John Sherwood noted, "But at Lafayette Square, across from the White House, the American Nazi party departed from the "Human Kindness" theme to sing "Happy Birthday" to Adolf Hitler." Earlier in the morning before the 1975 concert, bombs exploded at the Soviet Aeroflot airline office and the Mexican Chancelry in Washington, DC, and, as the concert started, telephone calls to the Washington Monument threatened another bombing there. An anti-Castro Cuban group claimed responsibility, and Cubans were protesting nearby at the meetings of the Organization of American States against its recognition of Fidel Castro.

The performers on stage could have understandably missed many of the quick robberies that occurred over the whole of the Mall area in 1974. A victim reporting the incident to the Park Police on the next day was told they there had been many more robberies than reported, including attacks on tourists. As a result, the Park Police urged the officials not to repeat the event in 1975. The police were overruled by the organizers, with the support of the press. After the concert, violence erupted in the Mall. The local news media reversed their approval of Human Kindness Day and it was never held again.
