= Silk & Soul =

Studio album by Nina Simone
- Released: October 1967
- Studio: RCA Studio B, New York City
- Genre: R&B, blues, gospel, pop, vocal
- Length: 30:34
- Label: RCA Victor
- Producer: Danny Davis

Nina Simone chronology
Sings the Blues (1967)	Silk & Soul (1967)	'Nuff Said! (1968)

Professional ratings
Review scores
Source	Rating
Tom Hull	C

Silk & Soul is the thirteenth studio album by American musician Nina Simone released in October 1967 by RCA Victor. It features the cuts "Go to Hell" and a cover of "I Wish I Knew How It Would Feel to Be Free".

== Information about songs on this album ==
- In 1968, Simone got a Grammy nomination for Best Female R&B Vocal Performance for the song "Go to Hell" from this album. She lost to Aretha Franklin.
- "It Be's That Way Sometime" was written by Nina's brother Sam Waymon.
- "The Look of Love" is a song by Burt Bacharach, originally written for the movie Casino Royale (1967).
- "I Wish I Knew How It Would Feel to Be Free" song was written by Billy Taylor. It was later recorded by Solomon Burke and Levon Helm, and can be regarded as a civil rights anthem.
- "Turning Point", which at first seems to be a child's song about making a new friend, later turns into a song questioning the origins of racism. Lyrics written by Martha Holmes.
- "Consummation" is a love song written by Nina Simone that uses the melody of "For All We Know", a song she originally recorded in the late 50s.

== Track listing ==
No.	Title	Writer(s)	Length
1.	"It Be's That Way Sometime"	Sam Waymon	2:58
2.	"The Look of Love"	Burt Bacharach, Hal David	2:23
3.	"Go to Hell"	Morris Bailey, Jr.	2:49
4.	"Love o' Love"	Andy Stroud	5:06
5.	"Cherish"	Terry Kirkman	3:22
6.	"I Wish I Knew How It Would Feel to Be Free"	Billy Taylor	3:09
7.	"Turn Me On"	John D. Loudermilk	2:26
8.	"Turning Point"	Martha Holmes	2:01
9.	"Some Say"	Charles Reuben	2:10
10.	"Consummation"	Nina Simone	4:10

2006 reissue bonus tracks
No.	Title	Writer(s)	Length
11.	"Why Must Your Love Well Be So Dry"	Harold Thomas, Randie Evretts, Virdia Crawford	2:20
12.	"Save Me"	Aretha Franklin, Carolyn Franklin, Curtis Ousley	3:22

== Charts ==
Chart (1967)	Peak position
US Billboard 200	158
US Hot R&B LPs	24

== Personnel ==
- Nina Simone – piano, vocals
- Gene Taylor – bass
- Eric Gale, Rudy Stevenson - guitar
- Ernie Hayes - piano, harpsichord
- Bernard Purdie - drums
- Sammy Lowe – arrangements, conductor

Technical

- Ray Hall – engineer
