= Nina's Choice =

Compilation album by Nina Simone
- Released: 1963
- Recorded: various dates, New York City (the studio recordings)
- Genre: Vocal, jazz, blues, folk
- Label: Colpix
- Producer: various

Nina Simone chronology
Nina Simone Sings Ellington (1962)	Nina's Choice (1963)	Nina Simone at Carnegie Hall (1963)

Nina's Choice is an album by singer/pianist/songwriter Nina Simone. It is a compilation of singles from previous albums at Colpix Records hand-picked by Simone.

== Track listing ==
No.	Title	Original Album	Length
1.	"Trouble In Mind"	Nina Simone at Newport
2.	"Memphis In June"	Forbidden Fruit
3.	"Cotton Eyed Joe"	Nina Simone at Town Hall
4.	"Work Song"	Forbidden Fruit
5.	"Forbidden Fruit"	Forbidden Fruit
6.	"Little Liza Jane"	Nina Simone at Newport
7.	"Rags And Old Iron"	Forbidden Fruit
8.	"You Can Have Him"	Nina Simone at Town Hall
9.	"Just Say I Love Him"	Forbidden Fruit
