= Sinner Man =

African American traditional spiritual song

Single by Les Baxter Chorus and Orchestra with Will Holt
- A-side: "Tango of the Drums"
- Released: 1956
- Recorded: 1956
- Genre: Gospel, jazz, pop
- Length: 3:07
- Label: Capitol
- Songwriters: Les Baxter, Will Holt

"Sinner Man" or "Sinnerman" is a song written by Les Baxter and Will Holt, and often performed in the style of an African American traditional spiritual song. It has been recorded by a number of performers and has been incorporated in many other media and arts. The lyrics describe a sinner attempting to hide from divine justice on Judgment Day. It was recorded in the 1950s by Les Baxter, the Swan Silvertones, the Weavers and others, before Nina Simone recorded an extended version in 1965.

== 1950s recordings ==
The earliest recording of the song to bear the title "Sinner Man" was by the Les Baxter Orchestra in 1956, as the B-side of the Capitol Records single "Tango of the Drums". The lead vocal was by folk singer Will Holt, who shared the credit for writing the song with Baxter. However, the song clearly bears a close resemblance, in both melody and lyrics, to "On the Judgement Day", which was recorded by gospel group The Sensational Nightingales in 1954 and released the following year on the Peacock label (catalog # 1743). The writing of The Sensational Nightingales' song was credited to two of the group's singers, Julius Cheeks and Ernest James. Some of the lyrics in "Sinner Man", including "The rock cried out, 'No hiding place'", appear to derive from those in the spiritual, "No Hiding Place Down Here", recorded in 1928 by the Old South Quartette.

A version of "Sinner Man" released in 1956, by Swedish-American folk singer William Clauson, credited Baxter, Holt, Cheeks and James as co-writers. Another gospel group, the Swan Silvertones, released their version of the song in 1957 on the Vee-Jay label, and folk singer Guy Carawan issued a version in 1958. Carawan wrote that he had learned the song in 1956 from Bob Gibson. Pete Seeger also refers to Bob Gibson as the one who 'taught us' the song, during his live concert at Mandel Hall, Chicago, in 1957. Most modern recorded versions derive from the 1956 recording by Les Baxter. Further changes and additions were codified in 1959 by the folk music group the Weavers. The Weavers' performance of the song appears on their compilation albums Gospel and Reunion at Carnegie Hall Part 2.

A not yet 19 years old Bob Dylan recorded the song at Karen Wallace's apartment, on May 1st, 1960. As we know from the Karen Wallace Tape, the circulating version is only a 38 secs snippet, and there is another clip only lasting 20 seconds, which can be listened to here.

== Nina Simone recording ==
"Sinnerman"

Song by Nina Simone

from the album Pastel Blues
- Released: May 20, 1965
- Recorded: New York City
- Genre: Jazz, gospel music
- Length: 10:20
- Label: Philips
- Songwriter: Traditional
- Producer: Hal Mooney

"Sinnerman" (spelled as one word) is one of Nina Simone's most famous songs. She recorded her definitive 10-minute-plus version on her 1965 album Pastel Blues, on which the credit is simply given as "arranged by Nina Simone". Simone learned the lyrics of the song in her childhood when it was used at revival meetings by her mother, a Methodist minister, to persuade people to confess their sins. In the early days of her career during the early sixties, when she was heavily involved in the Greenwich Village scene, Simone often used the long piece to end her live performances. An earlier version of the song exists, recorded live at The Village Gate, but was not used on the 1962 Colpix album Nina at the Village Gate. It was added as a bonus track to the 2005 CD release.

Simone's version of "Sinnerman" has been sampled by Kanye West for the Talib Kweli song "Get By" (2003) from his album Quality, by Timbaland for the song "Oh Timbaland" (2007) from his album Shock Value, and by Felix da Housecat for Verve Records' Verve Remixed series (Verve Remixed 2 (2003), Verve Remixed Plus (2005)). French rapper Abd al-Malik sampled Simone's version for the title track of his 2006 album Gibraltar. The 2018 Hozier featuring Mavis Staples track "Nina Cried Power" from his Nina Cried Power EP and the 2020 Celeste track "Stop This Flame" from her album Not Your Muse also sample the song. In 2021 the song was remixed by American DJ duo Sofi Tukker.

Nina Simone's version was used as a soundtrack to the art gallery theft scene in the 1999 film The Thomas Crown Affair. Her version is also played during the end credits of David Lynch's 2006 experimental film Inland Empire, and was featured in the 2006 video game Marc Ecko's Getting Up: Contents Under Pressure. Her version is used in the end scene of the 2006 film called "Golden Door" or "Nuovomondo", directed by Emmanuel Crialese. The film features actress Charlotte Gainsbourg as a lead character. It was featured in "The Reichenbach Fall", episode 3 of the second season of Sherlock in 2012. It was featured in a fight scene during "Extra Ordinary" a first season episode of The Umbrella Academy in 2019. and was also featured in the end credits of the seventh episode of Life on Mars in 2006. Furthermore, it played during a scene in Taika Waititi's 2016 film Hunt for the Wilderpeople. In season 1, episode 11 of Scrubs titled "My Own Personal Jesus," the song is playing in the background towards the end of the episode as Dr. Chris Turk (Donald Faison) runs to save Meredith (Granger Green), a woman who is giving birth in a park. The song is also used in "Witness", season 1, episode 7 of Person of Interest in 2011. It was featured in the first episode of the first season of "Ironheart".

=== Certifications ===
Region	Certification	Certified units/sales
United Kingdom (BPI)	Silver	200,000^{‡}
^{‡} Sales+streaming figures based on certification alone.

== Peter Tosh and the Wailers versions ==
"Sinner Man" has also been recorded as ska and reggae versions several times by the Wailers. It was first recorded by the group at Studio One in Kingston, Jamaica in early 1966; Peter Tosh and Bunny Wailer shared lead vocals.

A different version entitled "Downpressor" was recorded by Peter Tosh & The Wailers in 1970 ("downpressor" meaning "oppressor" in Rastafarian vocabulary). The song featured Tosh on lead vocals and Bunny Wailer on background. An instrumental version was also released. Songwriting credit for this version is sometimes given to Peter Tosh.

Another version was recorded in 1971 as "Oppressor Man". This version was billed as a Peter Tosh solo single, and the B-side of the single featured an instrumental version. It was one of the rarer songs from the period before being included, along with its version, on JAD's Black Dignity compilation in 2004.

Tosh recorded the song again as "Downpresser Man" for his 1977 solo album Equal Rights and released a live recording of the song in a medley with "Equal Rights" on his 1983 album Captured Live.

Irish singer/songwriter Sinéad O'Connor recorded a cover of Tosh's 1977 version for her 2005 reggae album Throw Down Your Arms at the then-Tuff Gong studio in Kingston, Jamaica.

== Other versions ==
Cory Wells & The Enemys recorded a version of the song in 1965, included on the 1993 Three Dog Night album Celebrate: The Three Dog Night Story, 1965–1975.

Another version of this song appears on the 1968 album El folklore de Nuestro Pequeño Mundo by Spanish band Nuestro Pequeño Mundo.

A cover of the song was the title track of the 1996 debut album, Sinnerman, by Atlantic Records recording artists Extra Fancy, led by openly gay singer Brian Grillo. The homoerotic music video made for the track featured Alexis Arquette as a closeted street preacher.

The band His Name Is Alive released a version of the song on their 1997 EP Nice Day (as "Oh Sinner Man").

The song has also been covered by 16 Horsepower on their album Folklore (2002); by Irish singer Sinéad O'Connor on her 2005 album Throw Down Your Arms; and by the ska-punk band Goldfinger.

In 2020, Vika and Linda covered the song for their album, Sunday (The Gospel According to Iso).

Jam band Goose has covered Simone's arrangement of the song for their live performances frequently since 2022.

Other works to have featured the song in their soundtracks include The Chestnut Man (TRILLS), Lucifer, Lovecraft Country (Alice Smith), The Righteous Gemstones (The Travelers Three), and Cirque du Soleil's Crystal (Béatrice Bonifassi).
