= Norman Curtis (composer) =

American pianist and composer (born 1933)

- Born: 1933 (age 92–93)
- Origin: New York City, New York, U.S.
- Occupation: Composer
- Instrument: Piano

Norman Curtis (born 1933) is an American pianist and composer based in New York City.

== Works ==
Revues:

- If We Grow Up
- Freedom Calling 1967

== Recordings ==
- Songs of Innocence album with soprano Peggy Smith 1960
