= Wild Is the Wind (album) =

Wild is the Wind

Studio album by Nina Simone
- Released: September 16, 1966
- Recorded: New York City, 1964–1965
- Genres: Jazz, blues, folk, R&B
- Length: 39:08
- Label: Philips
- Producer: Hal Mooney

Nina Simone chronology
Let It All Out (1965)	Wild is the Wind (1966)	High Priestess of Soul (1967)

Professional ratings
Review scores
Source	Rating
Allmusic	3/5 stars
Pitchfork	9.5/10

Wild Is the Wind is the eighth full studio album by American singer-songwriter and pianist Nina Simone released by Philips Records in 1966. The album was compiled from several recordings that were left over from sessions (in 1964 and 1965) for previous Philips albums.

In 2020, the album was ranked 212 on Rolling Stone's 500 Greatest Albums of All Time.

== Response ==
The album was a Billboard magazine "special merit pick" on release, with the reviewer commenting: "Simone ... sets up an exceptional romantic mood that offers top listening delight".

The song "Four Women" was released as a single, and gained attention when banned by the New York jazz focused radio station WLIB due to concern over the lyrics.

Simone first recorded "Black Is the Color of My True Love's Hair" in 1955, in Philadelphia with a strings arrangement and was not intended for release at the time. (In 1970 that version appeared on the album Gifted & Black.) In April 1964 she went into a New York Studio with her band, and on the second day in the studio, she recorded the version of "Black Is the Color of My True Love’s Hair" that would appear on Wild Is The Wind. For the song, Simone only wanted a minimal accompaniment with her playing the piano and a bass drone. Lisle Atkinson describes what he was asked to do during his time in Nina Simone’s band: “She wanted the least amount of complication as possible—roots and 5’s, nothing too slick. I have to give Nina credit for being aware that I could bow, and she utilized it a lot. She had me playing a lot of arco in performances.”

"Wild Is The Wind" was covered by David Bowie on his 1976 album Station to Station.

"Lilac Wine" was covered by Jeff Buckley on his album Grace (1994). "That's All I Ask" appears on several live albums including "Mystery White Boy" and "Live at L'Olympia"

The album was included in Robert Dimery's 1001 Albums You Must Hear Before You Die. The album was also ranked the fifth best album of the 1960s by Pitchfork, and the eighth-greatest album of all time by Paste.

== Track listing ==
No.	Title	Writer(s)	Length
1.	"I Love Your Lovin' Ways"	Bennie Benjamin; Sol Marcus	2:35
2.	"Four Women"	Nina Simone	4:24
3.	"What More Can I Say"	Horace Ott; Wade Brown Jr.	2:48
4.	"Lilac Wine"	James Shelton	4:13
5.	"That's All I Ask"	Horace Ott	2:28
6.	"Break Down and Let It All Out"	Van McCoy	2:37
7.	"Why Keep On Breaking My Heart"	Bennie Benjamin; Sol Marcus	2:34
8.	"Wild Is the Wind"	Dimitri Tiomkin; Ned Washington	6:56
9.	"Black Is the Color of My True Love's Hair"	Traditional	3:24
10.	"If I Should Lose You"	Ralph Rainger; Leo Robin	3:56
11.	"Either Way I Lose"	Van McCoy	2:43
Total length:			39:05

== Charts ==
Sales chart peaks for Wild Is the Wind
Chart 1966	Peak position
Billboard 200	110
Hot R&B LPs	12
