= I Wish I Knew How It Would Feel to Be Free =

Single by Nina Simone

from the album Silk & Soul
- B-side: "Cherish"
- Released: 1967
- Genre: Gospel, jazz
- Length: 3:06
- Label: RCA
- Songwriter: Billy Taylor

"I Wish I Knew How It Would Feel to Be Free" is a jazz piece written by American musician Billy Taylor, originally recorded as an instrumental and later released as a song with lyrics by Dick Dallas. Taylor's original version ("I Wish I Knew") was recorded on November 12, 1963, and released on his Right Here, Right Now! album (Capitol ST-2039) the following year. His 1967 live version, from the album of the same name, was later used as the theme music for the Film... review programme series on BBC Television.

Taylor said: "I wrote this song, perhaps my best-known composition, for my daughter Kim."

In June 2026, CBS News included the song in its list of the 250 essential American songs of the past 250 years.

== Cover versions ==
The song served as an anthem for the Civil Rights Movement in America in the 1960s. A widely played version was recorded by Nina Simone in 1967 on her Silk & Soul album.

Lighthouse Family covered it as "(I Wish I Knew How It Would Feel to Be) Free/One", a medley with U2's "One".

Other artists who have covered the song include Don Shirley (1968), Junior Mance (1968), Illinois Jacquet (1968), Solomon Burke (1968), Marlena Shaw (1969), Cold Blood (1969), John Denver (1969), Doris (1970), Mary Travers (1971), John Fahey (1976), Jools Holland (1997), The Derek Trucks Band (2006), Irma Thomas (2006), Levon Helm (2009), John Legend and the Roots (2010), Mavis Staples with Levon Helm (2011, released 2022), Emeli Sandé (2012), and The Blind Boys of Alabama featuring Béla Fleck (2021).

The song was also covered by Andra Day for the 2018 film Acrimony.

An arrangement of the song for soprano, chorus, and orchestra by Margaret Bonds was commissioned by Leontyne Price for her album with the Rust College Choir, but Price did not record Bonds's arrangement.

The 1996 film Ghosts of Mississippi featured two versions of the Taylor composition – one sung by Dionne Farris and the other by Nina Simone.

== Certifications ==
Region	Certification	Certified units/sales
United Kingdom (BPI) Nina Simone version	Silver	200,000^{‡}
^{‡} Sales+streaming figures based on certification alone.
