= Nina at the Village Gate =

Nina Simone at the Village Gate

Live album by Nina Simone
- Released: January 15, 1962
- Recorded: March 1961
- Venue: The Village Gate, New York City
- Genre: Vocal, jazz, blues, folk
- Length: 44:47
- Label: Colpix; CP 421 (mono), SCP 421 (stereo)
- Producer: Cal Lampey

Nina Simone chronology
Forbidden Fruit (1961)	Nina Simone at the Village Gate (1962)	Nina Simone Sings Ellington (1962)

Nina Simone at the Village Gate is a live album by singer Nina Simone. Released in early 1962, it was her third live album for Colpix (and sixth album overall). The album was recorded at The Village Gate, a nightclub in Greenwich Village, New York in late March 1961, nearly a year before it saw release. The recording was made by Richard Alderson, who at the time was the sound engineer at the Village Gate. The original release featured eight of the twelve songs performed at the gig. In 2005, an extended version of the album was released with the four remaining tracks.

Professional ratings
Review scores
Source	Rating
AllMusic	4.5/5 stars
Gaslight Records	9.5/10 stars
Record Mirror	3/5 stars

== Background ==
The album marks the inclusion of folk songs and African-related songs early in Simone's career. Richard Pryor had one of his first nights as a comedian opening for her.

== Use in media ==
- "Just in Time" was used at the end of the movie Before Sunset (2004).

== Critical reception ==
The record received a glowing response when reviewed in 2012 by Gaslight Records, being given a rating of 9.5/10. The reviewer highlighted the "rawness of the recording technique", stating that it catches the "incredible atmosphere" of the nightclub and succeeds in presenting "a young Nina Simone in her most real and free flowing state yet and this is perhaps most apparent in the way that her flawless vocal along with her innovative and dynamic piano playing shine through as effortless and unrivalled abilities without any need for recording studio gloss or trickery." AllMusic's reviewer stated that "Nina Simone, who was always in a category by herself, is heard throughout in her early prime," and that she "has the rare ability of really being able to dig into material and bring out unexpected meaning in familiar lyrics."

== Track listing ==
Side One
No.	Title	Writer(s)	Length
1.	"Just in Time"	Adolph Green; Betty Comden; Jule Styne	6:34
2.	"He Was Too Good to Me"	Richard Rodgers; Lorenz Hart	4:52
3.	"House of the Rising Sun"	Josh White; Libby Reynolds Holmes; Nicholas Ray	4:37
4.	"Bye Bye Blackbird" (instrumental)	Mort Dixon; Ray Henderson	8:15

Side Two
No.	Title	Writer(s)	Length
5.	"Brown Baby"	Oscar Brown	5:46
6.	"Zungo"	Babatunde Olatunji	3:00
7.	"If He Changed My Name"	Robert MacGimsey	3:58
8.	"Children Go Where I Send You"	Traditional; arranged by Nina Simone	7:45
Total length:			44:47

2005 CD bonus tracks "From The Same Sessions But Not Included On The Original LP"
No.	Title	Writer(s)	Length
9.	"Eretz Zavat Chalav U'dvash"	Eliahu Gamiel	7:10
10.	"Vaynikehu"	Gil Aldema	2:18
11.	"Sinnerman"	Traditional; arranged by Nina Simone	7:57
12.	"You'll Never Walk Alone"	Richard Rodgers; Oscar Hammerstein II	5:30
Total length:			67:42

== Personnel ==
- Nina Simone – vocals, piano
- Al Schackman – guitar
- Chris White – bass
- Bobby Hamilton – drums
