= 'Nuff Said! (Nina Simone album) =

Live album by Nina Simone
- Released: 1968
- Recorded: Live at Westbury Music Fair on April 7, 1968 tracks 1, 8 and 11: RCA Studios New York City May 13, 1968
- Genres: Jazz, blues, folk, pop
- Length: 33:37
- Label: RCA Victor
- Producer: Joe René for Stroud Productions

Nina Simone chronology
| Silk & Soul (1967) | 'Nuff Said! (1968) | Nina Simone and Piano (1969) |

'Nuff Said! is an album by jazz singer/pianist/songwriter Nina Simone. It was recorded—excluding tracks 1, 8, and 11—at Westbury Music Fair, April 7, 1968, three days after the murder of Martin Luther King Jr. The whole program that night was dedicated to his memory. The album featured one of Simone's biggest hits in Europe, "Ain't Got No, I Got Life".

== Songs ==
- "Backlash Blues", a civil rights protest song first recorded on Nina Simone Sings the Blues.
- "Gin House Blues", first recorded on Forbidden Fruit.
- "Why? (The King of Love Is Dead)", written by Simone's bass player Gene Taylor after the news of Martin Luther King Jr.'s death had reached him. It was performed here for the first time. The song was heavily cut from the longer original recording, which featured a lot of Simone's monologue.
- "Ain't Got No, I Got Life", a medley from the musical Hair (Rado, Ragni, MacDermot). It became a hit in Europe, reaching number two on the British charts and number one on the Dutch charts. Compared to the single, the album version has applause from the Westbury Music Fair concert crossfaded over the beginning and end, additional overdubbed drums, and towards the end of the song the vocal is double-tracked.
- "In the Morning", an early Bee Gees song, is also a studio recording, with added applause and the compere's introduction from the Westbury Music Fair concert.
- "I Loves You Porgy" is a song from George Gershwin's Porgy & Bess (George & Ira Gershwin, DuBose Heyward). It was first recorded by Simone on her debut album Little Girl Blue.
- "Do What You Gotta Do", written by Jimmy Webb, is a studio recording, also issued as the B-side to "Ain't Got No, I Got Life". It is used in the film Bridget Jones's Diary and it appears in the second soundtrack album. A sample of "Do What You Gotta Do" can be heard on Kanye West's track "Famous" from the album The Life of Pablo.
- "Please Read Me" is a cover of another early Bee Gees song from the 1967 album Bee Gees' 1st.

== Track listing ==
(The order of tracks can vary)

| No. | Title | Writer(s) | Length |
|---|---|---|---|
| 1. | "In the Morning" | Barry Gibb | 2:29 |
| 2. | "Sunday in Savannah" | Hugh MacKay | 3:25 |
| 3. | "Backlash Blues" | Langston Hughes, Nina Simone | 2:48 |
| 4. | "Please Read Me" | Robin Gibb, Barry Gibb | 2:52 |
| 5. | "Gin House Blues" | Fletcher Henderson, Henry Troy | 3:07 |
| 6. | "Why? (The King of Love Is Dead)" | Gene Taylor | 5:44 |
| 7. | "Peace of Mind" | Nick Woods | 2:45 |
| 8. | "Ain't Got No, I Got Life" | Galt MacDermot, James Rado, Gerome Ragni | 2:07 |
| 9. | "I Loves You Porgy" | George Gershwin, Ira Gershwin, DuBose Heyward | 3:28 |
| 10. | "Take My Hand, Precious Lord" | Thomas A. Dorsey | 1:52 |
| 11. | "Do What You Gotta Do" | Jimmy Webb | 3:00 |

== Personnel ==
- Nina Simone – vocals, piano
- Rudy Stevenson – guitar
- Samuel Wayman – organ
- Gene Taylor – bass
- Buck Clarke – drums
- Horace Ott – arranger and conductor on "Do What You Gotta Do"

Technical

- Ed Begley – engineer
- Ray Hall – engineer on "Do What You Gotta Do"

== Charts ==
| Chart (1968) | Peak position |
|---|---|
| US Hot R&B LPs | 44 |
