= I Put a Spell on You (book) =

1992 autobiography by Nina Simone

I Put A Spell On You: The Autobiography of Nina Simone
- Cover of the Da Capo Press reprint edition, 2003
- Author: Nina Simone with Stephen Cleary
- Language: English and various translations (such as Dutch)
- Genre: Autobiography
- Publisher: Pantheon, New York. Reprint edition: Da Capo Press
- Publication date: 1992
- Publication place: written in Amsterdam, the Netherlands
- Media type: Print (Hardback & Paperback)
- Pages: 192
- ISBN: 0-679-41068-6
- OCLC: 24373968
- Dewey Decimal: 782.42164/092 B 20
- LC Class: ML420.S5635 A3 1992

I Put A Spell On You: The Autobiography of Nina Simone is the 1992 autobiography by Nina Simone (1933–2003), written with Stephen Cleary.

== Publication ==
The 192-page book was published February 1, 1992 by Pantheon. It was re-released in a 2003 Da Capo Press reprint edition following Simone's death on April 21, 2003; this edition included an introduction, "I Know How it Feels To Be Free: Nina Simone 1933–2003", written by Dave Marsh.

== Contents ==
- Acknowledgements
- Prologue
- Chapters 1 through 11
- Discography
- Index

== Reception ==
The book received mixed reviews. Reviewing the book in The Washington Post, Gerald Early felt, "The best part of this autobiography...is Simone's recollection of her childhood," but said "in the end, [the book] seems sketchy and self-defensive....She tells very little either about the times in which she lived, or about the people who were most instrumental to her growth after her childhood," noting his disappointment with this absence given she "occupied an influential and unusual place in American cultural history, attracting Cafe Society-type white audiences at the same time that she maintained her integrity with a politicized young black audience. There is much to be said about the period from 1958 to 1968, and Simone would have been a stunning witness to it." Discussing the latter part of the autobiography, Tom Piazza wrote in The New York Times, "In the 1970s, through a series of stunningly bad choices (and some plain bad luck), [Simone] began a slide into personal and professional misfortune. If her eagerness to cast the blame in every direction except inward -- at lovers, husbands, managers, America itself -- is irritating, one can't help admiring her survivor's spirit."
