= Ain't Got No, I Got Life =

Single by Nina Simone

from the album 'Nuff Said
- B-side: "Do What You Gotta Do"
- Released: 1968
- Recorded: RCA studios, New York City
- Genre: Pop, soul
- Length: 2:57
- Label: RCA
- Songwriters: James Rado, Gerome Ragni, Galt MacDermot

"Ain't Got No, I Got Life" is a 1968 single by American singer-songwriter Nina Simone, from her album 'Nuff Said. It is a medley of two songs, "Ain't Got No" and "I Got Life", from the musical Hair, with lyrics by James Rado and Gerome Ragni and music by Galt MacDermot. The combination of the two songs was rewritten by Simone to suit her purpose.

The song peaked at number 2 in the UK and at number 1 in the Netherlands. It also charted on the Billboard Hot 100, where it reached number 94. The song helped Simone gain popularity under a new, younger audience, and became a standard in her repertoire.

== Assessment and performance ==
Yale musicologist Daphne Brooks described the song as "a new black anthem" – a "wholly original" reimagining of the material to create a "trademark" racial protest song as powerful as Simone's earlier "Mississippi Goddam" and "Four Women".

Vanderbilt Professor Emily J. Lordi agreed that the song was an anthem, bonding the two Hair songs "in accordance with soul logic" such that Simone puts the lie to the first lyric about having nothing. Simone proves with her energy and expression that she has "multiple homes, including a home in her own body." She asserts her racial and musical "high priestess" power to transform deprivation into abundance. In the 1969 New York City performance included on Simone's live album Black Gold, she brings the song to a false ending, inviting applause, then continues for additional minutes. Lordi said, "This is a technique from the gospel playbook, and its effect is to indicate that the rest of the performance is running on reserves of spirit—an effect she will also produce when she sings the last word." Simone invites a call-and-response connection with the audience, then leads them to a sense of shared community, a rediscovery of their collective soul.

A live performance of the song by Simone serves as an emotional peak in the 2015 documentary film What Happened, Miss Simone? by Liz Garbus. In the film, Simone performs at the piano, wearing a strapless black crocheted outfit, her long earrings swinging, and her hair styled in a short afro. She begins with the "desolation, alienation and disenfranchisement" of "Ain't Got No", then transitions to the "jubilant affirmation" of "I Got Life." Images of the Black Power movement recall the feeling of soul-searching African Americans asking the question "Who am I?"

== Differences between masters; alternate mixes ==
"Ain't Got No, I Got Life" was recorded in two versions:

- Version 1 starts with a repeated piano hook, and is a smoothly played jazz number.
- Version 2 starts with a guitar and horn section riff, and has a strong rock beat.

Both versions made their way into modern-day ad campaigns, the former a few years after the latter. Unlike the single, the album version has applause from Simone's Westbury Music Fair concert crossfaded over the beginning and end, and additional overdubbed drums; and towards the end of the song, the vocal is double-tracked.

A "Groovefinder remix" of the song appeared on the 2006 album Remixed and Reimagined, an album of remixes of Simone's songs. The remix reached number 30 in the UK and remained on the charts for 16 weeks. In Ireland it peaked at number 9 and remained on the charts for 15 weeks.

In 2010, research conducted by PRS for Music revealed that the song was the second most performed in UK television advertising due to its use in Müller yoghurt adverts between 2004 and 2011. Most-recently in 2020, the song was featured in a US commercial for One A Day vitamins.

"Ain't Got No, I Got Life" was included in the book 1001 Songs You Must Hear Before You Die.

== Charts ==
Chart (1968)	Peak position
Belgium (Ultratop 50 Flanders)	10
Belgium (Ultratop 50 Wallonia)	19
Netherlands (Dutch Top 40)	1
UK Singles (OCC)	2
US Billboard Hot 100	94

== Sales ==
Sales for "Ain't Got No, I Got Life"
Region	Sales
United Kingdom	300,000

== Legacy ==
"Ain't Got No, I Got Life" has been interpolated multiple times. These include:

- Body/Head's "Ain't" (2013)
- Lauryn Hill's "I've Got Life" (2015)
- Luedji Luna's "Ain't Got No (feat. Conceição Evaristo)" (2020)
