= Nina Simone =

American musician (1933–2003)

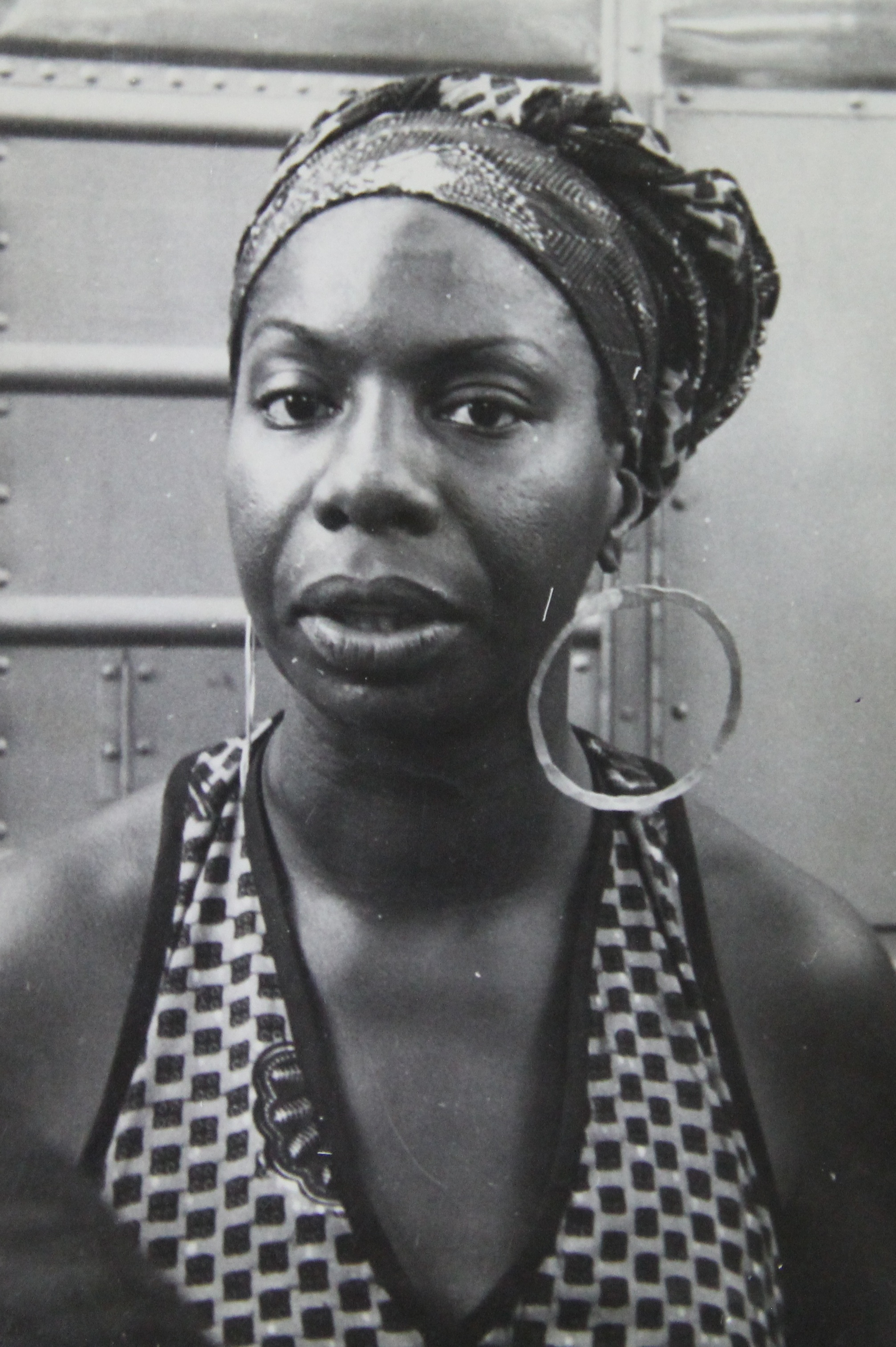
- Simone in 1969

Background information
- Born: Eunice Kathleen Waymon; February 21, 1933; Tryon, North Carolina, U.S.
- Died: April 21, 2003 (aged 70) Carry-le-Rouet, France
- Genres: Jazz; R&B; pop; classical; folk; gospel; blues; soul
- Occupations: Singer; songwriter; pianist; composer; arranger; activist
- Instruments: Vocals; piano
- Works: Nina Simone discography
- Years active: 1954–2003
- Labels: Bethlehem; Colpix; Elektra; Philips; RCA Victor; CTI; Legacy; Verve
- Spouses: Donald Ross (m. 1958; div. 1960); Andy Stroud (m. 1961; div. 1971)
- Website: www.ninasimone.com
- Children: Lisa Simone

Nina Simone (/ˈniːnə sɪˈmoʊn/ NEE-nə sim-OHN; born Eunice Kathleen Waymon; February 21, 1933 – April 21, 2003) was an American composer, concert pianist, singer, songwriter, and civil rights activist. Simone's bearing and stage presence earned her the title the High Priestess of Soul. Her music spanned styles including classical, folk, gospel, blues, jazz, R&B, and pop. Her piano playing was strongly influenced by baroque and classical music, especially Johann Sebastian Bach, and accompanied expressive, jazz-like singing in her contralto voice. Rolling Stone named Simone one of the greatest singers on various lists.

The sixth of eight children born into a respected family in North Carolina, Simone initially aspired to be a concert pianist. With the help of a local fund set up in her hometown, she enrolled at Allen High School for Girls, then spent a summer at the Juilliard School of Music in New York City, preparing to apply for a scholarship to study at the Curtis Institute of Music in Philadelphia. She failed to gain admission to Curtis, which she attributed to racism. She remained musically active until her death in 2003, two days after the institute awarded her an honorary degree.

Early in her career, to make a living, she played piano at a nightclub in Atlantic City. She changed her name to "Nina Simone" to disguise herself from family members, having chosen to play "the devil's music" or so-called "cocktail piano". She was told in the nightclub that she would have to sing to her own accompaniment, which effectively launched her career as a jazz vocalist. After making her debut with Little Girl Blue in 1958, she went on to record more than 40 albums up to 1974. She released her first and biggest hit single in the United States in 1959 with "I Loves You, Porgy", which peaked inside the top 20 of the Billboard Hot 100 chart.

Simone became known for her work in the civil rights movement during the 1950s and 1960s, and she later left the United States and settled in France following the assassination of Martin Luther King Jr. in 1968. She lived and performed in Europe, Africa, and the Caribbean throughout the 1970s, 1980s, and 1990s. In 1991, Simone published her autobiography, I Put a Spell on You (taking the title from her famous 1965 album), and she continued to perform and attract audiences until her death.

== Biography ==
=== 1933–1954: Early life ===
Simone was born Eunice Kathleen Waymon on February 21, 1933, in a 650-square-foot, three-room clapboard house in Tryon, North Carolina, the sixth of eight children in a respected family. Her father, John Divine Waymon, worked as a barber and dry-cleaner as well as an entertainer. Her mother, Mary Kate Irvin, was a Methodist preacher. Simone began playing piano at the age of three or four. The first song she learned was "God Be With You, Till We Meet Again". Demonstrating a talent with the piano, she performed at her local church. Her concert debut, a classical recital, was given when she was 12. Simone later said that during this performance, her parents, who had taken seats in the front row, were forced to move to the back of the hall to make way for white people. She said that she refused to play until her parents were moved back to the front, and that the incident contributed to her later involvement in the civil rights movement. Simone's music teacher helped establish a special fund to pay for her education. Subsequently, a local fund was set up to assist her continued education. With the help of this scholarship money, she was able to attend Allen High School for Girls in Asheville, North Carolina where she graduated as the valedictorian.

After her graduation, Simone spent the summer of 1950 at the Juilliard School as a student of Carl Friedberg, preparing for an audition at the Curtis Institute of Music in Philadelphia. Her application was denied. Only three of 72 applicants were accepted that year, but as her family had relocated to Philadelphia in the expectation of her entry to Curtis, the blow to her aspirations was particularly heavy. She was outspoken about her application having been denied because of racial prejudice, a charge the staff at Curtis have denied, particularly as African Americans Blanche Burton-Lyles and George Walker had both studied at Curtis.

Discouraged, she took private piano lessons with Vladimir Sokoloff, a professor at Curtis, but never could re-apply. At the time, the Curtis Institute did not accept students over 21. She took a job as a photographer's assistant, found work as an accompanist at Arlene Smith's vocal studio, and taught piano from her home in Philadelphia.

=== 1954–1959: Early success ===
In order to fund her private lessons, Simone performed at the Midtown Bar & Grill on Pacific Avenue in Atlantic City, New Jersey, whose owner insisted that she sing as well as play the piano, which increased her income to $90 a week. In 1954, she adopted the stage name "Nina Simone". "Nina", derived from niña, was a nickname given to her by a boyfriend named Chico, and "Simone" was taken from the French actress Simone Signoret, whom she had seen in the 1952 movie Casque d'Or. Knowing her mother would not approve of her playing "the Devil's music", she used her new stage name to remain undetected. Simone's mixture of jazz, blues, and classical music in her performances at the bar earned her a small but loyal fan base.

In 1958, she befriended and married Don Ross, a beatnik who worked as a fairground barker, but quickly regretted their marriage. After leaving Ross, Simone moved to New York. While playing in small clubs, she recorded her debut album Little Girl Blue which was released in February 1959 through Bethlehem Records. It included George Gershwin's "I Loves You, Porgy" (from Porgy and Bess), which she learned from a Billie Holiday album and performed as a favor to a friend. It was subsequently released as a single and became her only Billboard top 20 single in the United States. Because she had sold her rights outright for $3,000 (equivalent to $31,100 in 2025), Simone lost more than $1 million in royalties (notably for the 1980s re-release of her version of the jazz standard "My Baby Just Cares for Me") and never benefited financially from the album's sales.

=== 1959–1964: Burgeoning popularity ===
After the success of Little Girl Blue, Simone signed a contract with producer Hecky Krasnow at Colpix Records and recorded a multitude of studio and live albums. Colpix relinquished all creative control to her, including the choice of material that would be recorded, in exchange for her signing the contract with them. After the release of her live album Nina Simone at Town Hall, Simone became a favorite performer in Greenwich Village. By this time, Simone performed pop music only to make money to continue her classical music studies and was indifferent about having a recording contract. She kept this attitude toward the record industry for most of her career.

While in New York, Simone became friends with civil rights and gay rights activists and artists such as James Baldwin, Langston Hughes, and Lorraine Hansberry, with whom she would also collaborate professionally (see below). She had a number of same-sex affairs and at least one relationship with a woman whom she was in love with. She noted being attracted to men and women in her diary and was bisexual, but never came out as such.

In December 1961, Simone married Andrew Stroud, a detective with the New York Police Department. In a few years he became her manager and the father of her daughter Lisa. Simone later said that he abused her psychologically and physically. Simone said that Stroud treated her "like a work horse" in an interview with the BBC in 1999. Stroud is also often the primary source for information about Simone's sexuality, leading Simone scholar Jordan Alexander Stein to argue that basing "nearly the entire biographical account of Simone's sexuality" on "her ex-husband's speculative report of what she may have done with other people" does not give an adequate account of the complexities of attraction, desire, and self-understanding that Simone may have experienced.

=== 1964–1974: Civil rights era ===
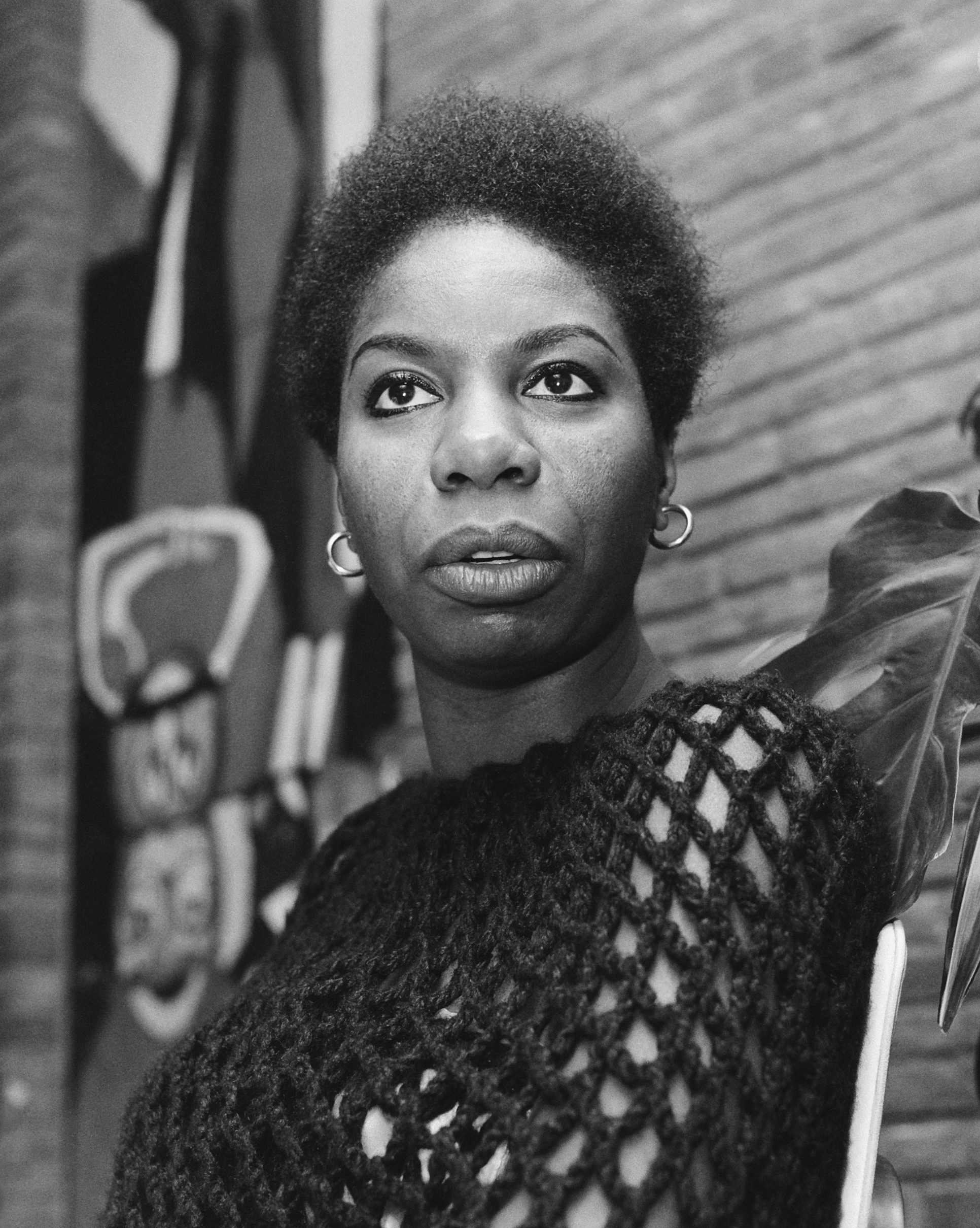
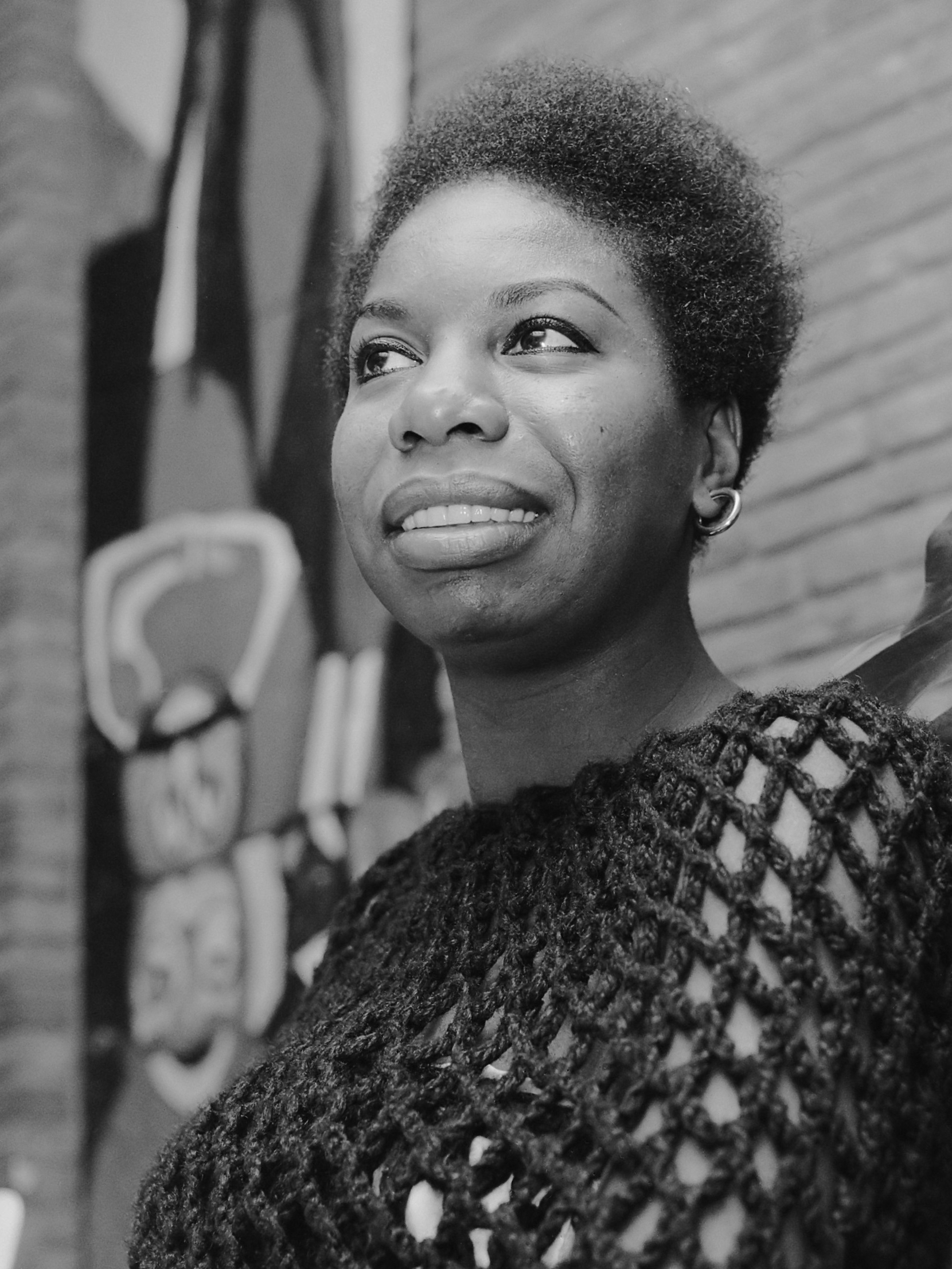
Simone during a photoshoot in 1965

In 1964, Simone changed record distributors from Colpix, an American company, to the Dutch Philips Records, which meant a change in the content of her recordings. She had always included songs in her repertoire that drew on her African-American heritage, such as "Brown Baby" by Oscar Brown and "Zungo" by Michael Olatunji on her album Nina at the Village Gate in 1962. On her debut album for Philips, Nina Simone in Concert (1964), for the first time she addressed racial inequality in the United States in the song "Mississippi Goddam".

This was her response to the June 12, 1963, murder of Medgar Evers and the September 15, 1963, bombing of the 16th Street Baptist Church in Birmingham, Alabama, that killed four young black girls and partly blinded a fifth. She said that the song was "like throwing ten bullets back at them", becoming one of many other protest songs written by Simone. The song was released as a single, and it was boycotted in some southern states. Promotional copies were smashed by a Carolina radio station and returned to Philips.

She later recalled how "Mississippi Goddam" was her "first civil rights song" and that the song came to her "in a rush of fury, hatred and determination". The song challenged the belief that race relations could change gradually and called for more immediate developments: "me and my people are just about due." It was a key moment in her path to Civil Rights activism. "Old Jim Crow", on the same album, addressed the Jim Crow laws. After "Mississippi Goddam", a civil rights message was the norm in Simone's recordings and became part of her concerts. As her political activism rose, the rate of release of her music slowed.

Simone performed and spoke at civil rights meetings, such as at the Selma to Montgomery marches. Like Malcolm X, her neighbor in Mount Vernon, New York, she supported black nationalism and advocated violent revolution rather than Martin Luther King Jr.'s non-violent approach. She hoped that African Americans could use armed combat to form a separate state, though she wrote in her autobiography that she and her family regarded all races as equal.

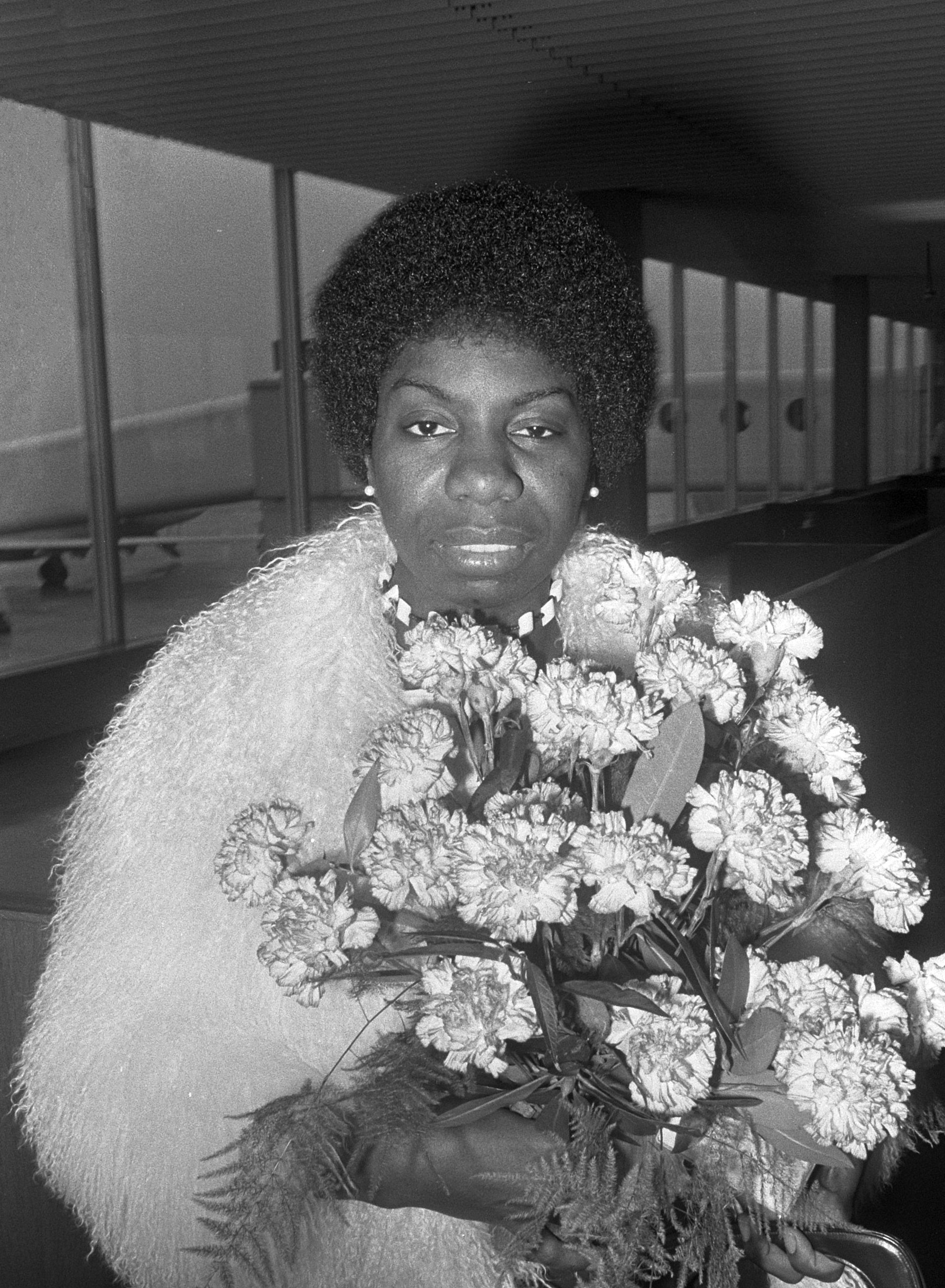
Simone at Amsterdam Airport Schiphol in Amsterdam, Netherlands, in March 1969

In 1967, Simone moved from Philips to RCA Victor. She sang "Backlash Blues" written by her friend, Harlem Renaissance leader Langston Hughes, on her first RCA Victor album, Nina Simone Sings the Blues (1967). On Silk & Soul (1967), she recorded Billy Taylor's "I Wish I Knew How It Would Feel to Be Free" and "Turning Point".

Her 1968 album 'Nuff Said! contained live recordings from the Westbury Music Fair of April 7, 1968, three days after the assassination of Martin Luther King Jr. She dedicated the performance to him and sang "Why? (The King of Love Is Dead)", a song written by her bass player, Gene Taylor. In 1969, she performed at the Harlem Cultural Festival in Harlem's Mount Morris Park. The performance was recorded and is featured in Questlove's 2021 documentary Summer of Soul.

Simone and Weldon Irvine turned the unfinished play To Be Young, Gifted and Black by Lorraine Hansberry into a civil rights song of the same name. She credited her friend Hansberry with cultivating her social and political consciousness. She performed the song live on the album Black Gold (1970). A studio recording was released as a single, and renditions of the song have been recorded by Aretha Franklin (on her 1972 album Young, Gifted and Black) and Donny Hathaway. When reflecting on this period, she wrote in her autobiography: "I felt more alive then than I feel now because I was needed, and I could sing something to help my people."

=== 1974–1993: Later life ===
In an interview for Jet magazine, Simone stated that her controversial song "Mississippi Goddam" harmed her career. She claimed that the music industry punished her by boycotting her records. Hurt and disappointed, Simone left the US in September 1970, flying to Barbados and expecting her husband and manager Stroud to communicate with her when she had to perform again.

Stroud interpreted Simone's sudden disappearance, and the fact that she had left behind her wedding ring, as an indication of her desire for a divorce. As her manager, Stroud was in charge of Simone's income. When Simone returned to the United States, she learned that a warrant had been issued for her arrest for unpaid taxes, allegedly unpaid as a protest against her country's involvement with the Vietnam War, and fled to Barbados to evade the authorities and prosecution.

Simone stayed in Barbados for quite some time and had a lengthy affair with the Prime Minister, Errol Barrow. A close friend, singer Miriam Makeba, then persuaded her to go to Liberia. When Simone relocated, she abandoned her daughter Lisa in Mount Vernon. Lisa eventually reunited with Simone in Liberia, but, according to Lisa, her mother was physically and mentally abusive. The abuse was so unbearable that Lisa became suicidal and she moved back to New York to live with her father.

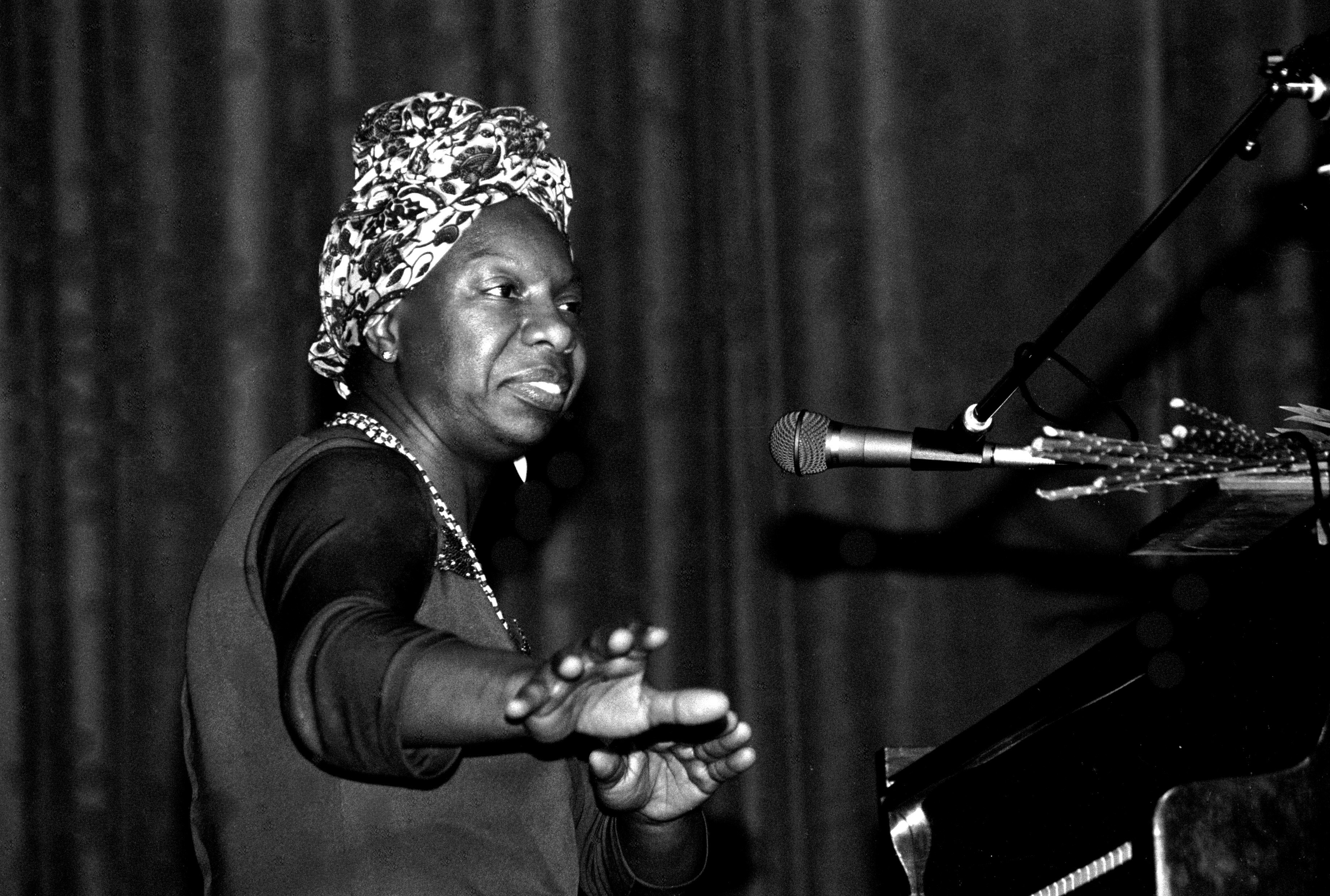
Simone at a concert in Morlaix, France, May 1982

Simone recorded her last album for RCA, It Is Finished, in 1974, and did not make another record until 1978, when she was persuaded to go into the recording studio by CTI Records owner Creed Taylor. The result was the album Baltimore, which, while not a commercial success, was fairly well received critically and marked a quiet artistic renaissance in Simone's recording output. Her choice of material retained its eclecticism, ranging from spiritual songs to Hall & Oates' "Rich Girl". Four years later, Simone recorded Fodder on My Wings on a French label, Studio Davout.

In the 1980s, Simone performed regularly at Ronnie Scott's Jazz Club in London, where she recorded the album Live at Ronnie Scott's in 1984. Although her early on-stage style could be somewhat haughty and aloof, in later years, Simone particularly seemed to enjoy engaging with her audiences sometimes, by recounting humorous anecdotes related to her career and music and by soliciting requests. By this time, she stayed everywhere and nowhere. She lived in Liberia, Barbados and Switzerland and eventually ended up in Paris. There she regularly performed in a small jazz club called Aux Trois Mailletz for relatively small financial reward. The performances were sometimes brilliant and at other times Nina Simone gave up after fifteen minutes. Often she was too drunk to sing or play the piano properly. At other times, she scolded the audience, so that manager Raymond Gonzalez, guitarist Al Schackman and Gerrit de Bruin, a Dutch friend of hers, decided to intervene.

In 1987, Simone scored a major European hit with the song "My Baby Just Cares for Me". Recorded by her for the first time in 1958, the song was used in a commercial for Chanel No. 5 perfume in Europe, leading to a re-release of the recording. The song reached number 4 on the UK's NME singles chart, giving Simone a brief surge in popularity in the UK and elsewhere.

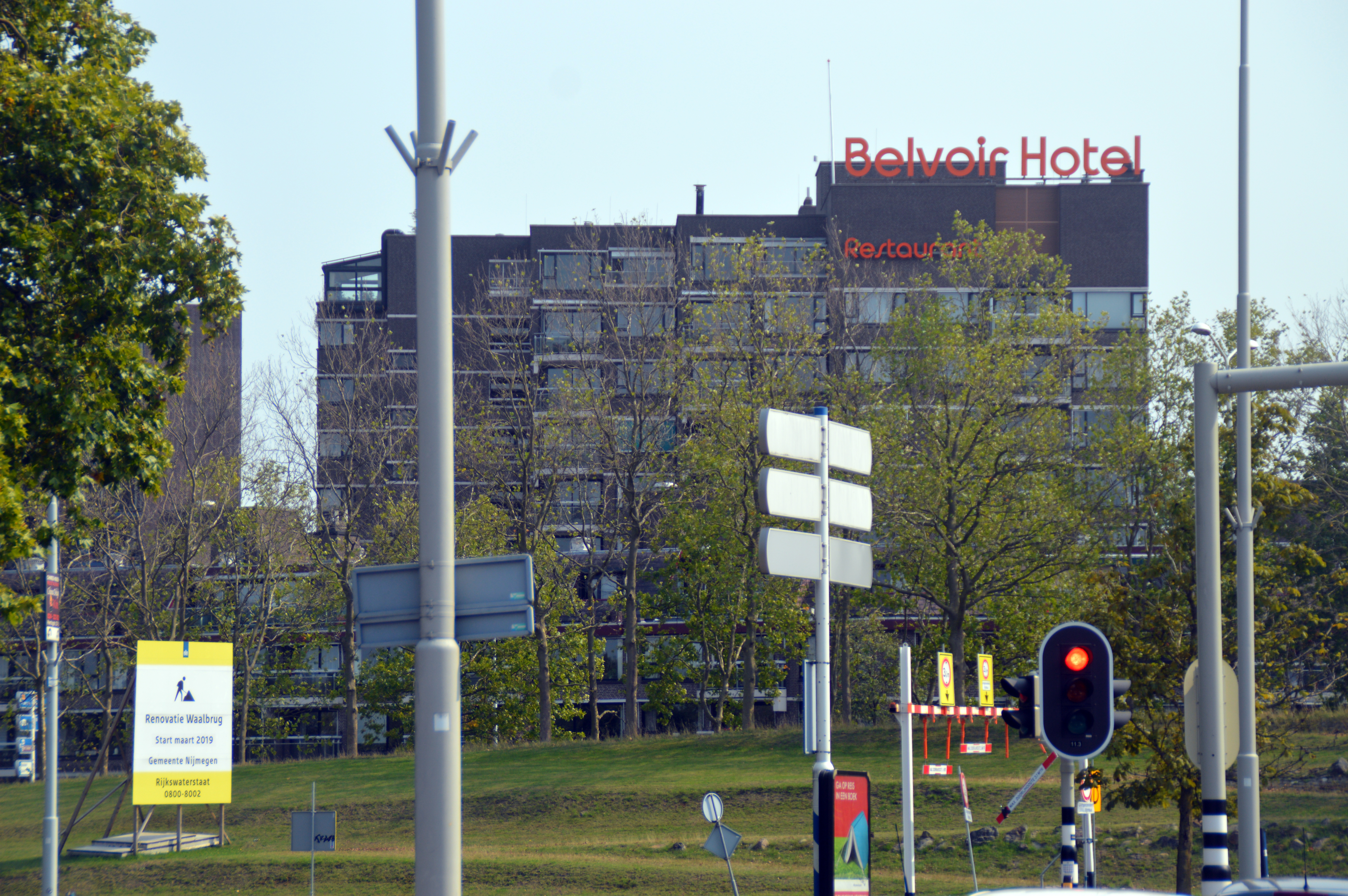
Hotel Belvoir, Nijmegen, Netherlands. Simone's apartment between 1988 and 1991 was next to this building.

In the spring of 1988, Simone moved to Nijmegen in the Netherlands. She bought an apartment next to the Belvoir Hotel with views of the Waalbrug and Ooijpolder, with the help of her friend Gerrit de Bruin, who lived with his family a few corners away. Simone was diagnosed with bipolar disorder by a friend of De Bruin, who prescribed Trilafon (perphenazine) for her. Despite the diagnosis, it was generally a happy time for Simone in Nijmegen, where she could lead a fairly anonymous life. Only a few recognized her; most Nijmegen people did not know who she was. Slowly but surely her life started to improve, and she was even able to make money from the Chanel commercial after a legal battle. In 1991 Nina Simone exchanged Nijmegen for Amsterdam, where she lived for two years with friends and Hammond.

=== 1993–2003: Final years, illness and death ===
In 1993, Simone settled near Aix-en-Provence in southern France, in Bouches-du-Rhône. In the same year, her final album, A Single Woman, was released. She variously contended that she married or had a love affair with a Tunisian around this time, but that their relationship ended because, "His family didn't want him to move to France, and France didn't want him because he's a North African." During a 1998 performance in Newark, she announced: "If you're going to come see me again, you've got to come to France, because I am not coming back."

She suffered from breast cancer for several years before she died in her sleep at her home in Carry-le-Rouet, on April 21, 2003, at the age of 70. Her Catholic funeral service at the local parish was attended by singers Miriam Makeba and Patti LaBelle, poet Sonia Sanchez, actors Ossie Davis and Ruby Dee, and hundreds of others. Simone's ashes were scattered in several African countries. Her daughter Lisa Celeste Stroud is an actress and singer who took the stage name Simone, and who has appeared on Broadway in Aida.

== Activism ==
=== Influence ===
Simone's consciousness on the racial and social discourse was prompted by her friendship with the playwright Lorraine Hansberry. Simone stated that during her conversations with Hansberry "we never talked about men or clothes. It was always Marx, Lenin and revolution – real girls' talk." The influence of Hansberry planted the seed for the provocative social commentary that became an expectation in Simone's repertoire. One of Nina's more hopeful activism anthems, "To Be Young, Gifted and Black", was written with collaborator Weldon Irvine in the years following the playwright's passing, acquiring the title of one of Hansberry's unpublished plays. Simone's social circles included notable black activists such as James Baldwin, Stokely Carmichael and Langston Hughes: the lyrics of her song "Backlash Blues" were written by Hughes.

=== Beyond the civil rights movement ===
Simone's social commentary was not limited to the civil rights movement; the song "Four Women" exposed the Eurocentric appearance standards imposed on Black women in America, as it explored the internalized dilemma of beauty that is experienced between four Black women with skin tones ranging from light to dark. She explains in her autobiography I Put a Spell on You that the purpose of the song was to inspire Black women to define beauty and identity for themselves without the influence of societal impositions. Chardine Taylor-Stone has noted that, beyond the politics of beauty, the song also describes the stereotypical roles that many Black women have historically been restricted to: the mammy, the tragic mulatto, the sex worker, and the angry Black woman.

== Artistry ==
=== Simone standards ===
Simone assembled a collection of songs that became standards in her repertoire. Most were either new arrangements of existing standards or songs written for her by collaborators; only about ten of the songs Simone recorded were written or co-written by her, and three of her solo writing credits were for instrumentals. Nonetheless, she owned her work musically, and many of her covers are taken as definitive. Simone's first hit song in the US was her rendition of George Gershwin's "I Loves You, Porgy" (1958). It peaked at number 18 on the Billboard magazine Hot 100 chart.

During that same period, Simone recorded "My Baby Just Cares for Me", which would become her biggest success years later, in 1987, after it was featured in a 1986 Chanel No. 5 perfume commercial. A music video was created by Aardman Studios. Well-known songs from her Philips albums include "Don't Let Me Be Misunderstood" on Broadway-Blues-Ballads (1964); "I Put a Spell on You", "Ne me quitte pas" (a rendition of a Jacques Brel song), and "Feeling Good" on I Put a Spell On You (1965); and "Lilac Wine" and "Wild Is the Wind" on Wild is the Wind (1966).

"Don't Let Me Be Misunderstood" and her takes on "Sinnerman" (Pastel Blues, 1965) and "Feeling Good" have remained popular in cover versions (most notably a version of the former song by the Animals), sample usage, and their use on soundtracks for various movies, television series, and video games. "Sinnerman" has been featured in the films The Crimson Pirate (1952), The Thomas Crown Affair (1999), High Crimes (2002), Cellular (2004), Déjà Vu (2006), Miami Vice (2006), Golden Door (2006), Inland Empire (2006), Harriet (2019) and Licorice Pizza (2021), as well as in TV series such as Homicide: Life on the Street (1998, "Sins of the Father"), Nash Bridges (2000, "Jackpot"), Scrubs (2001, "My Own Personal Jesus"), Chuck (2010, "Chuck vs. the Honeymooners"), Boomtown (2003, "The Big Picture"), Person of Interest (2011, "Witness"), Shameless (2011, "Kidnap and Ransom"), Love/Hate (2011, "Episode 1"), Sherlock (2012, "The Reichenbach Fall"), The Blacklist (2013, "The Freelancer"), Vinyl (2016, "The Racket"), Lucifer (2017, "Favorite Son"), and The Umbrella Academy (2019, "Extra Ordinary"), and sampled by artists such as Talib Kweli (2003, "Get By"), Timbaland (2007, "Oh Timbaland"), and Flying Lotus (2012, "Until the Quiet Comes"). The song "Don't Let Me Be Misunderstood" was sampled by Devo Springsteen on "Misunderstood" from Common's 2007 album Finding Forever, and by little-known producers Rodnae and Mousa for the song "Don't Get It" on Lil Wayne's 2008 album Tha Carter III. "See-Line Woman" was sampled by Kanye West for "Bad News" on his album 808s & Heartbreak. The 1965 rendition of "Strange Fruit", originally recorded by Billie Holiday, was sampled by Kanye West for "Blood on the Leaves" on his album Yeezus.

Simone's years at RCA spawned many singles and album tracks that were popular, particularly in Europe. In 1968, it was "Ain't Got No, I Got Life", a medley from the musical Hair from the album 'Nuff Said! (1968) that became a surprise hit for Simone, reaching number 2 on the UK Singles Chart and introducing her to a younger audience. In 2006, it returned to the UK Top 30 in a remixed version by Groovefinder.

The following single, a rendition of the Bee Gees' "To Love Somebody", reached the UK Top 10 in 1969. "The House of the Rising Sun" was featured on Nina Simone Sings the Blues in 1967, but Simone had recorded the song in 1961 and it was featured on Nina at the Village Gate (1962).

=== Performance style ===
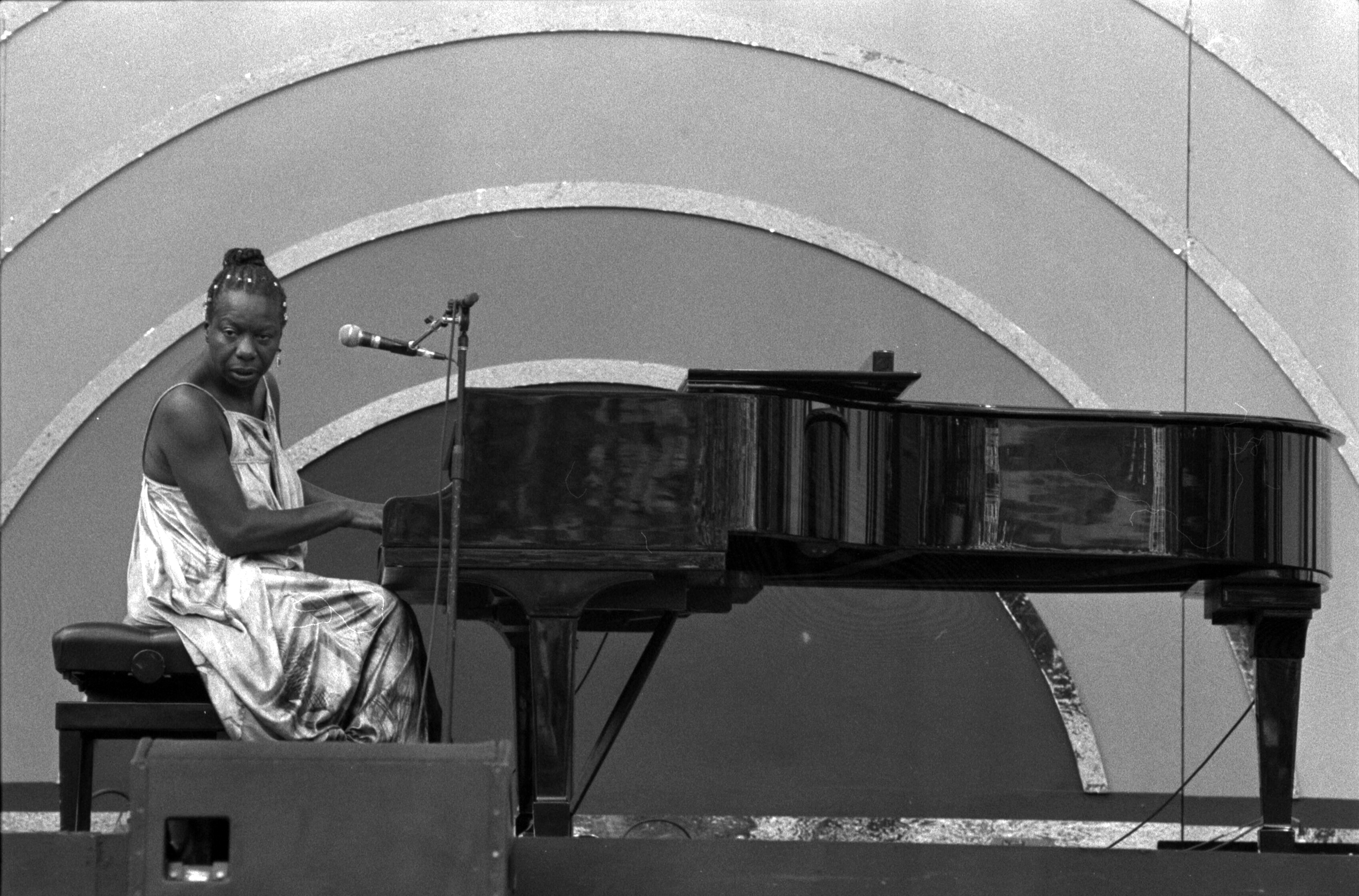
Simone at the 1986 Playboy Jazz Festival

Simone's bearing and stage presence earned her the title "the High Priestess of Soul". She was a pianist, singer and performer, "separately, and simultaneously". As a composer and arranger, Simone moved from gospel to blues, jazz, and folk, and to numbers with European classical styling. Besides using Bach-style counterpoint, she called upon the particular virtuosity of the 19th-century Romantic piano repertoire—Chopin, Liszt, Rachmaninoff, and others. Jazz trumpeter Miles Davis spoke highly of Simone, deeply impressed by her ability to play three-part counterpoint and incorporate it into pop songs and improvisation. Onstage, she incorporated monologues and dialogues with the audience into the program, and often used silence as a musical element. Throughout most of her life and recording career she was accompanied by percussionist Leopoldo Fleming and guitarist and musical director Al Schackman. She was known to pay close attention to the design and acoustics of each venue, tailoring her performances to individual venues. Rolling Stone once said that Simone could "channel every facet of lived experience." Simone was often credited for her ability to express an expansive emotional range in her music, from immeasurable rage to limitless joy.

Simone trained for years as a pianist and never as singer. In a 1970 interview, she described her practice to Arthur Taylor: "In spite of my limited range and limited voice, I sang everything I heard. The piano helped because I have perfect pitch. I would play the songs in the easiest key to sing in, so that nobody could detect that my voice was limited. By the time I got into show business, I had studied the piano seriously for fourteen years, practicing for about six hours a day. I never studied voice, but I had been around people who had studied voice, so I knew a little about it. I just used whatever came naturally to me". Though Simone's voice registers in the contralto range, her real performance signature was not how deep her voice was, but rather her inclination to hold notes, "elongating them in dynamic tension with the progress of a song's instrumental melodies".

Simone was a difficult and unpredictable performer, occasionally hectoring the audience if she felt they were disrespectful. Schackman would try to calm Simone during these episodes, performing solo until she calmed offstage and returned to finish the engagement. Her early experiences as a classical pianist had conditioned Simone to expect quiet attentive audiences, and her anger tended to flare up at nightclubs, lounges, or other locations where patrons were less attentive. Schackman described her live appearances as hit or miss, either reaching heights of hypnotic brilliance or on the other hand mechanically playing a few songs and then abruptly ending concerts early.

=== Critical reputation ===
Simone is regarded as one of the most influential recording artists of 20th-century jazz, cabaret and R&B genres. According to Rickey Vincent, she was a pioneering musician whose career was characterized by "fits of outrage and improvisational genius". Pointing to her composition of "Mississippi Goddam", Vincent said Simone broke the mold, having the courage as "an established black musical entertainer to break from the norms of the industry and produce direct social commentary in her music during the early 1960s".

Rolling Stone wrote that "her honey-coated, slightly adenoidal cry was one of the most affecting voices of the civil rights movement", while making note of her ability to "belt barroom blues, croon cabaret and explore jazz—sometimes all on a single record". In the opinion of AllMusic's Mark Deming, she was "one of the most gifted vocalists of her generation, and also one of the most eclectic". Creed Taylor, who wrote the liner notes for Simone's 1978 Baltimore album, said the singer possessed a "magnificent intensity" that "turns everything—even the most simple, mundane phrase or lyric—into a radiant, poetic message". Jim Fusilli, music critic for The Wall Street Journal, writes that Simone's music is still relevant today: "it didn't adhere to ephemeral trends, it isn't a relic of a bygone era; her vocal delivery and technical skills as a pianist still dazzle; and her emotional performances have a visceral impact."

"She is loved or feared, adored or disliked", Maya Angelou wrote in 1970, "but few who have met her music or glimpsed her soul react with moderation."

== Health ==
Simone was diagnosed with bipolar disorder in the late 1980s. She was known for her temper and outbursts of aggression.

Singer-songwriter Janis Ian, a friend of Simone's in the early and mid-1970s, related in her autobiography Society's Child: My Autobiography (2008) an incident in which Simone forced at gunpoint a Los Angeles sidewalk vendor to take back a pair of sandals she had already worn, and to refund her money. The vendor complied, and law enforcement did not get involved.

Ian also recalled an incident in which Simone ripped a payphone from its wall, backstage at a concert venue, when Ian refused to pay royalties for Simone having recorded one of her songs.

In 1985, Simone fired a gun at a record company executive, whom she accused of stealing royalties. Simone said she had been trying to kill him but missed. In 1995, while living in France, she shot and wounded her neighbor's son with an air gun after his laughter disturbed her concentration on practicing piano, and she perceived his response to her complaints as racial insults. She was sentenced to eight months in jail, which was suspended pending a psychiatric evaluation and treatment.

According to a biographer, Simone took medication from the mid-1960s onward, although this was supposedly only known to a small group of intimates. After her death, the medication was confirmed as the anti-psychotic Trilafon (perphenazine), which Simone's friends and caretakers sometimes illegally mixed into her food without her knowledge when she refused to follow her treatment plan. This fact was kept from the public until 2004 when a biography, Break Down and Let It All Out, written by Sylvia Hampton and David Nathan of her UK fan club, was published posthumously.

== Awards and recognition ==
Simone was the recipient of a Grammy Hall of Fame Award in 2000 for her interpretation of "I Loves You, Porgy". On Human Kindness Day 1974 in Washington, D.C., more than 10,000 people paid tribute to Simone. Simone received two honorary degrees in music and humanities, from Amherst College and Malcolm X College. She preferred to be called "Dr. Nina Simone" after these honors were bestowed upon her. She was inducted into the Rock and Roll Hall of Fame in 2018.

Two days before her death, Simone learned she would be awarded an honorary degree by the Curtis Institute of Music, the music school that had refused to admit her as a student at the beginning of her career.

Simone has received four career Grammy Award nominations, two during her lifetime and two posthumously. In 1968, she received her first nomination for Best Female R&B Vocal Performance for the track "(You'll) Go to Hell" from her thirteenth album Silk & Soul (1967). The award went to "Respect" by Aretha Franklin.

Simone garnered a second nomination in the category in 1971, for her Black Gold album, when she again lost to Franklin for "Don't Play That Song (You Lied)". Franklin would again win for her cover of Simone's "Young, Gifted and Black" two years later in the same category. In 2016, Simone posthumously received a nomination for Best Music Film for the Netflix documentary What Happened, Miss Simone? and in 2018 she received a nomination for Best Rap Song as a songwriter for Jay-Z's "The Story of O.J." from his 4:44 album, which contained a sample of "Four Women" by Simone.

In 1999, Simone was given a lifetime achievement award by the Irish Music Hall of Fame, presented by Sinead O'Connor.

In 2018, she was inducted into the Rock and Roll Hall of Fame by fellow R&B artist Mary J. Blige.

In 2019, "Mississippi Goddam" was selected by the Library of Congress for preservation in the National Recording Registry for being "culturally, historically, or aesthetically significant". Simone was inducted into the National Rhythm & Blues Hall of Fame in 2021.

In 2023, Rolling Stone ranked Simone at No. 21 on their list of the 200 Greatest Singers of All Time.

== Legacy and influence ==
=== Music ===
Simone's music has been featured in soundtracks of various motion pictures and video games, including La Femme Nikita (1990), Point of No Return (1993), Shallow Grave (1994), The Big Lebowski (1998), Billy's Hollywood Screen Kiss (1998), Any Given Sunday (1999), The Thomas Crown Affair (1999), Disappearing Acts (2000), Six Feet Under (2001), The Dancer Upstairs (2002), Before Sunset (2004), Cellular (2004), Inland Empire (2006), Miami Vice (2006), Sex and the City (2008), The World Unseen (2008), Revolutionary Road (2008), Home (2008), Watchmen (2009), The Saboteur (2009), Repo Men (2010), Beyond the Lights (2014), Love the Coopers (2015), Hunt for the Wilderpeople (2016), Nobody (2021), and A Quiet Place: Day One (2024). Frequently her music is used in remixes, commercials, and TV series including "Feeling Good", which featured prominently in the Season Four Promo of Six Feet Under (2004). Simone's "Take Care of Business" is the closing theme of The Man from U.N.C.L.E. (2015), Simone's cover of Janis Ian's "Stars" is played during the final moments of the season 3 finale of BoJack Horseman (2016), and "I Wish I Knew How It Would Feel to Be Free" and "Don't Let Me Be Misunderstood" were included in the film Acrimony (2018).

=== Film ===
The documentary Nina Simone: La légende (The Legend) was made in the 1990s by French filmmakers and based on her autobiography I Put a Spell on You. It features live footage from different periods of her career, interviews with family, various interviews with Simone then living in the Netherlands, and while on a trip to her birthplace. A portion of footage from The Legend was taken from an earlier 26-minute biographical documentary by Peter Rodis, released in 1969 and entitled simply Nina. Her filmed 1976 performance at the Montreux Jazz Festival is available on video courtesy of Mercury Studios and is screened annually in New York City at an event called "The Rise and Fall of Nina Simone: Montreux, 1976", which is curated by Tom Blunt.

Footage of Simone singing "Mississippi Goddam" for 40,000 marchers at the end of the Selma to Montgomery marches can be seen in the 1970 documentary King: A Filmed Record... Montgomery to Memphis and the 2015 Liz Garbus documentary What Happened, Miss Simone?

Plans for a Simone biographical film were released at the end of 2005, to be based on Simone's autobiography I Put a Spell on You (1992) and to focus on her relationship in later life with her assistant, Clifton Henderson, who died in 2006; Simone's daughter, Lisa Simone Kelly, has since refuted the existence of a romantic relationship between Simone and Henderson on account of his homosexuality. Cynthia Mort (screenwriter of Will & Grace and Roseanne), wrote the screenplay and directed the 2016 film Nina, starring Zoe Saldaña, who since openly apologized for taking the controversial title role.

In 2015, two documentary features about Simone's life and music were released. The first, directed by Liz Garbus, What Happened, Miss Simone? was produced in cooperation with Simone's estate and her daughter, who served as the film's executive producer. The film was produced as a counterpoint to the unauthorized Cynthia Mort film (Nina, 2016), and featured previously unreleased archival footage. It premiered at the Sundance Film Festival in January 2015 and was distributed by Netflix on June 26, 2015. It was nominated on January 14, 2016, for a 2016 Academy Award for Best Documentary Feature.

The second documentary in 2015, The Amazing Nina Simone is an independent film written and directed by Jeff L. Lieberman, who initially consulted with Simone's daughter, Lisa before going the independent route and then worked closely with Simone's siblings, predominantly Sam Waymon. The film debuted in cinemas in October 2015, and has since played more than 100 theaters in 10 countries.

=== Drama ===
She is the subject of Nina: A Story About Me and Nina Simone, a one-woman show first performed in 2016 at the Unity Theatre, Liverpool—a "deeply personal and often searing show inspired by the singer and activist Nina Simone"—and which in July 2017 ran at the Young Vic, before being scheduled to move to Edinburgh's Traverse Theatre. Simone is the focus of another play that premiered in 2016, Nina Simone: Four Women, by Christina Ham. This "play looks at Nina Simone's shift from artist to activist after the bombing of the 16th Street Baptist Church in Birmingham and the murder of Medgar Evers."

=== Books ===
As well as her 1992 autobiography I Put a Spell on You (1992), written with Stephen Cleary, Simone has been the subject of several books. They include Nina Simone: Break Down and Let It All Out (2004) by Sylvia Hampton and David Nathan; Princess Noire (2010) by Nadine Cohodas; Nina Simone (2004) by Kerry Acker; Nina Simone, Black Is the Color (2005) by Andrew Stroud; Nina Simone (2013) by Richard Elliott; and What Happened, Miss Simone? (2016) by Alan Light.

Simone inspired a book of poetry, Me and Nina, by Monica Hand, and is the focus of musician Warren Ellis's book Nina Simone's Gum (2021).

=== Honors ===
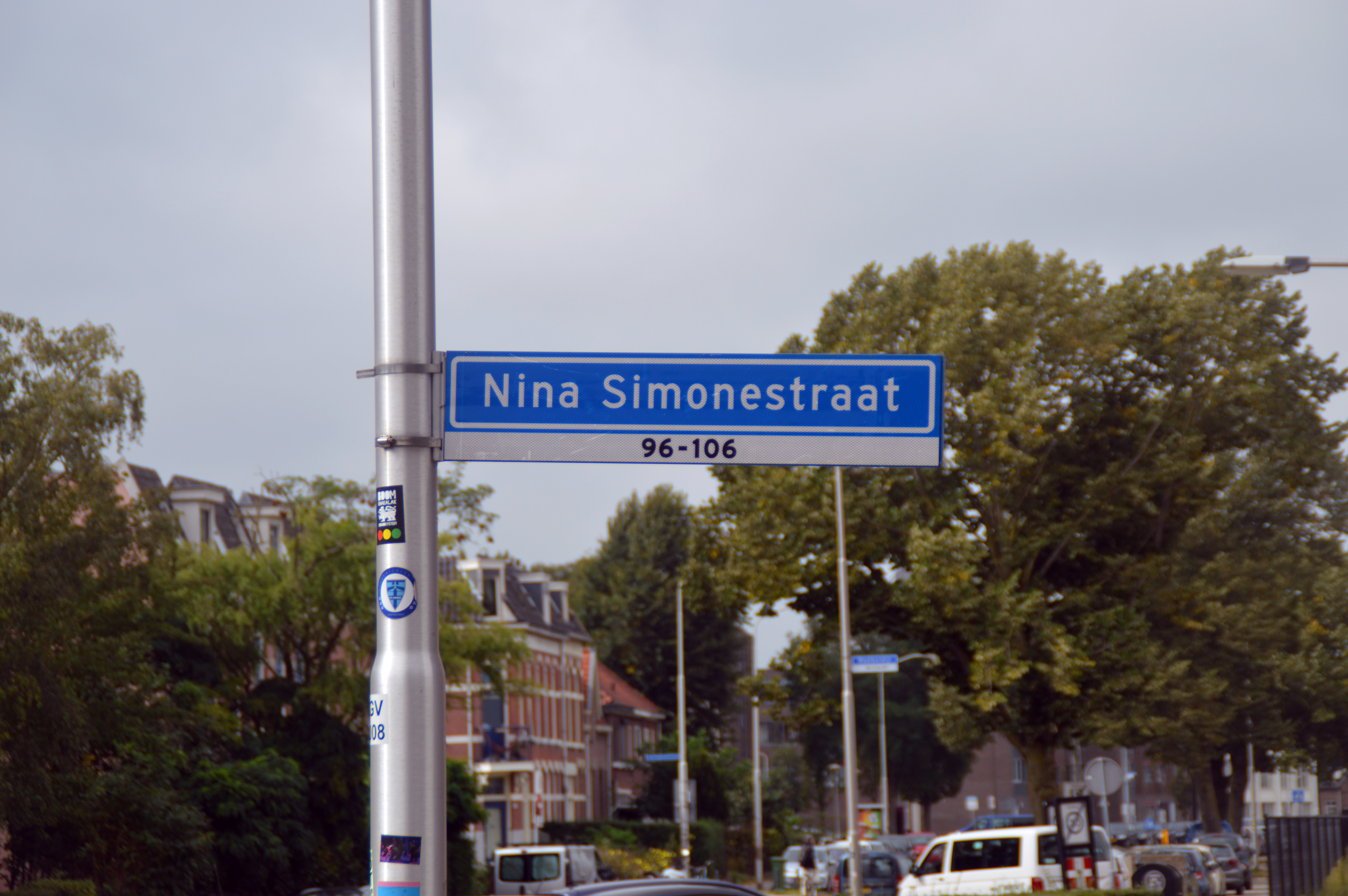
Nina Simonestraat in Nijmegen, Netherlands

In 2002, the city of Nijmegen, Netherlands, named a street after her, as "Nina Simone Street": she had lived in Nijmegen between 1988 and 1990. On August 29, 2005, the city of Nijmegen, the De Vereeniging concert hall, and more than 50 artists (among whom were Frank Boeijen, Rood Adeo, and Fay Claassen) honored Simone with the tribute concert Greetings from Nijmegen.

Simone was inducted into the North Carolina Music Hall of Fame in 2009.

In 2010, a statue in her honor was erected on Trade Street in her native Tryon, North Carolina.

The 2021 graduating class of the French Institute of Political Studies of Lille (Sciences Po Lille) voted in 2017 to name themselves in her honour.

Simone was inducted into the Rock and Roll Hall of Fame in 2018.

The Proms paid a homage to Nina Simone in 2019, an event called Mississippi Goddamn was performed by The Metropole Orkest at Royal Albert Hall led by Jules Buckley. Ledisi, Lisa Fischer and Jazz Trio, LaSharVu provided vocals. Ledisi embarked on the Nina and Me Tour throughout 2019, and released a tribute album titled Ledisi Sings Nina (2021). Following the release of the album, she embarked on her second tribute concert titled Ledisi Sings Nina Tour in 2021.

== Discography ==
Studio albums

- Little Girl Blue (1959)
- The Amazing Nina Simone (1959)
- Nina Simone at Town Hall (Live and studio) (1959)
- Forbidden Fruit (1961)
- Nina Simone Sings Ellington (1962)
- Broadway-Blues-Ballads (1964)
- I Put a Spell on You (1965)
- Pastel Blues (1965)
- Wild Is the Wind (1966)
- High Priestess of Soul (1967)
- Nina Simone Sings the Blues (1967)
- Silk & Soul (1967)
- Nina Simone and Piano (1969)
- To Love Somebody (1969)
- Here Comes the Sun (1971)
- Emergency Ward (Live and studio) (1972)
- Baltimore (1978)
- Fodder on My Wings (1982)
- Nina's Back (1985)
- A Single Woman (1993)

== See also ==
- List of people from Harlem

== Sources ==
- Acker, Kerry (2004). Nina Simone. Introduction by Betty McCollum. Philadelphia: Chelsea House. ISBN 978-0-791-07456-5.
- Brun-Lambert, David (October 2006) [2006]. Nina Simone, het tragische lot van een uitzonderlijke zangeres (in Dutch). Introduction by Lisa Celeste Stroud, afterword by Gerrit de Bruin. Zwolle: Sirene. ISBN 90-5831-425-1.
- Brun-Lambert, David (2009). Nina Simone: The Biography. Translated by Paul Morris and Isabelle Villancher. London: Aurum Press. ISBN 1845135105.
- Cohodas, Nadine (2010). Princess Noire: The Tumultuous Reign of Nina Simone. New York: Pantheon Books. ISBN 978-0-375-42401-4.
- Elliott, Richard (2013). Nina Simone. Icons of Pop Music. Sheffield, UK: Equinox. ISBN 978-1-845-53988-7.
- Hampton, Sylvia; Nathan, David (2004) [2004]. Nina Simone: Break Down and Let It All Out. Introduction by Lisa Celeste Stroud. London: Sanctuary. ISBN 1-86074-552-0.
- Light, Alan (2016). What Happened, Miss Simone?: A Biography. New York: Crown Archetype. ISBN 978-1-101-90487-9.
- Simone, Nina; Stephen Cleary (2003) [1992]. I Put a Spell on You. Introduction by Dave Marsh (2nd ed.). New York: Da Capo Press. ISBN 0-306-80525-1.
- Stein, Jordan Alexander (2024). Fantasies of Nina Simone. Durham, NC: Duke University Press. ISBN 978-1-4780-3070-6.
- Stroud, Andy (2005). Nina Simone, "Black Is the Color...": A Book of Rare Photographs of Adolescence, Family and Early Career with Quotes in Her Own Words. Introduction by Lisa Simone Kelly. Philadelphia: Xlibris. ISBN 978-1-599-26670-1.
- Todd, Traci N. (2021). Nina: A Story of Nina Simone. New York: G. P. Putnam's Sons. ISBN 9781524737283.
- Williams, Richard (2002). Nina Simone: Don't Let Me Be Understood. Edinburgh: Canongate. ISBN 978-1-841-95368-7.
