= Nina Simone and Piano =

Nina Simone and Piano!

Studio album by Nina Simone
- Released: 1969
- Recorded: September 16 & October 1, 1968
- Studio: RCA Studios, New York City
- Genre: Vocal jazz
- Length: 49:37
- Label: RCA Victor
- Producer: Stroud Productions

Nina Simone chronology
'Nuff Said! (1968)	Nina Simone and Piano! (1969)	To Love Somebody (1969)

Professional ratings
Review scores
Source	Rating
Allmusic	2.5/5 stars
Tom Hull	B

Nina Simone and Piano! is an album by American jazz singer, songwriter, and pianist Nina Simone, with Simone accompanying herself on piano.

== Track listing ==
No.	Title	Writer(s)	Length
1.	"Seems I'm Never Tired Lovin' You"	Carolyn Franklin	3:01
2.	"It's Nobody's Fault but Mine"	Simone	2:59
3.	"I Think It's Going to Rain Today"	Randy Newman	3:20
4.	"Everyone's Gone to the Moon"	Jonathan King	3:07
5.	"Compensation"	Paul Laurence Dunbar, Simone	1:36
6.	"Who Am I?"	Leonard Bernstein	4:09
7.	"Another Spring"	Angelo Badalamenti, John Clifford	3:32
8.	"The Human Touch"	Charles Reuben	2:09
9.	"I Get Along Without You Very Well (Except Sometimes)"	Hoagy Carmichael	4:49
10.	"The Desperate Ones"	Eric Blau, Gérard Jouannest, Mort Shuman	4:42

2003 re-release bonus tracks
No.	Title	Writer(s)	Length
11.	"Music for Lovers"	Bart Howard	4:23
12.	"In Love in Vain"	Jerome Kern, Leo Robin	2:29
13.	"I'll Look Around"	George C. Cory Jr., Douglass Cross	5:12
14.	"The Man with the Horn"	Eddie DeLange, Jack Jenney, Bonnie Lake	3:39

== Personnel ==
- Nina Simone - vocals, piano, arrangements

Technical

- Ray Hall - engineer
- Joseph Dylewski - photography
