= Al Schackman =

American jazz guitarist and arranger (born 1933)

- Born: Alvin Schackman; October 5, 1933 (age 92); New York, United States
- Occupations: Guitarist, musical director, arranger
- Years active: 1950s –present

Alvin Schackman (born October 5, 1933) is an American jazz guitarist and arranger, most noted for his long association with Nina Simone as her accompanist from 1957 to 2000.

== Biography ==
Born in New York, Schackman grew up in the Catskills before moving with his family to Brooklyn. He learned the guitar under teacher Rector Bailey, who had previously worked with Nat King Cole, and in his teens began touring with mixed race bands in the South.

By 1957, he was working as a session musician in New York as well as performing with his own jazz group in Greenwich Village. One night, when Nina Simone was performing at the Playhouse Inn in New Hope, Pennsylvania, where Schackman lived, she agreed to him joining her on stage. According to Schackman, "Some people heard me playing and thought it would be great if the two of us would play together, so they asked her, and she said okay..." The pairing was successful, Schackman later commenting: "I had never felt such freedom in knowing that someone knew exactly where I was going, and that she knew that I knew exactly where she was going... It was like telepathy....I think we saw, in each other's playing, a reflection of the way we approached music, which was to tell a story beyond the notes and with color..." Schackman remained Simone's collaborator, accompanist, musical director and arranger, touring and recording with her for almost the whole of her career, from 1957 to 2000. He is close to her daughter Lisa Simone Kelly, and sometimes cared for her for extended periods in her youth due to Nina's tempestuous marriage to manager Andrew Stroud and the singer's occasional mental health issues.

Schackman also continued to work as a session musician, featuring on albums by Babatunde Olatunji, Harry Belafonte, Pearls Before Swine, Lee Konitz, and others. As well as guitar, he occasionally contributed on other instruments including piano, sitar, congas, vibraphone and marimba.
