= Chris and Thomas =

American folk duo

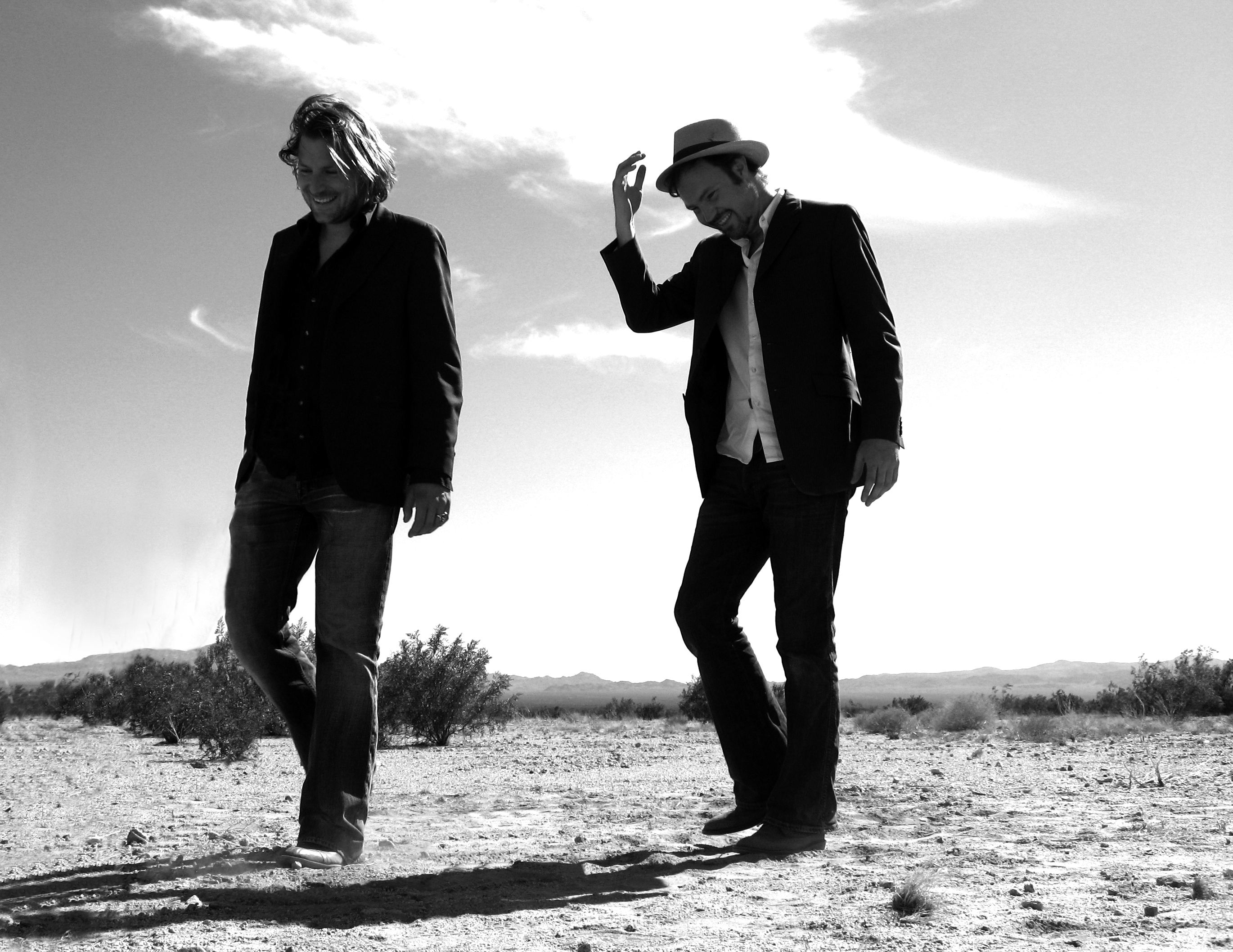
- Chris and Thomas: Christopher Anderson (right) and Thomas Hien (left)

Background information
- Origin: Los Angeles, California, United States
- Genres: Folk; Americana; Indie
- Years active: 2003–present
- Label: Defend Music
- Members: Christopher Anderson; Thomas Hien

Chris and Thomas are an American folk duo Christopher Anderson and Thomas Hien. They are signed with Defend Music.

== History ==
Christopher Anderson and Thomas Hien became close friends during their years at the historic art school in Liverpool. They played the Irish pubs and sang for the Queen while they earned music degrees in film composition.

In the late 1990s, the two had created "Cook Au Van", a travelling cooking show. The vehicle for the show was an old gas board utility van that they had converted into a five star restaurant. Made from found objects, the van boasted water fountains, changing works of art and a fully functional wet bar. Inside the van, they hosted dinner parties for the Lord Mayor and countless British celebrities. After doing the circus lifestyle with the traveling restaurant and cooking for the likes of Jarvis Cocker, Bill Drummond, politicians and fine artists, the two had decided to turn back to their true love of music.

The duo's live debut was on November 18, 2003, at the Hotel Café in Los Angeles, California, opening for singer-songwriter Alexi Murdoch. Their unique live performance, which involved playing with one condenser microphone and gathering around it like some modern day Carter Family, quickly earned Chris and Thomas a name on the L.A. club circuit.

A breakthrough event for the duo occurred while returning from a weekend in Joshua Tree, where the two were greeted by multiple phone messages from excited friends who had heard their song "Take These Thoughts" on L.A.'s influential KCRW. Their EP, Vista Street Sessions, was passed on by a mutual friend to the station's tastemaker DJ and music director Nic Harcourt. Harcourt programmed the disc on his show, and eventually included it on NPR's syndicated Sounds Eclectic, which introduced a national audience to Chris and Thomas.

On-air performances on KCRW and other radio stations followed with appearances at SXSW and other venues and festivals throughout the country. More radio stations have added Chris and Thomas to their playlists in the US, and Europe.

"Take These Thoughts" won best song of the year in the Americana category at the Independent Music Awards 2006. The duo's full-length debut Land Of Sea was recorded with producer/engineer Mark Howard (Bob Dylan, U2, Tom Waits). Howard, who used to work with producer Daniel Lanois for over ten years, has a unique way of recording. He rented out an old sound stage in Hollywood, where he set up vintage recording equipment, Persian rugs, and Victorian lamps and brought in musicians to accompany Chris and Thomas on their record.

The record was first released in the UK in 2006 in conjunction with a five-week tour and has gained critical acclaim and positive reviews (4 stars) and runner-up to album of the month in the music magazine MOJO. The US release occurred in late August 2007.

Chris and Thomas and Oscar-nominated composer John Debney wrote the title song for Garry Marshall's 2007 film Georgia Rule starring Lindsay Lohan and Jane Fonda.

Most recently, the duo scored music for the 2010 Sony Pictures hit movie Friendship! (2010) directed by Markus Goller and starring Matthias Schweighöfer

With their records being played on NPR, Chris and Thomas have an audience everywhere they play: places like the Roxy in Los Angeles, and the Mercury Lounge in New York.

After performing in the US for years they have become recognized by NPR including:

- NPR World Cafe November 2007
- NPR World Cafe August 2007
- NPR Artists To Watch March 2006
- NPR Song of the Day October 23, 2007

== Members ==
=== Christopher Anderson ===
Christopher Anderson was born in Detroit, Michigan and grew up in Memphis, Tennessee.

He studied literature at Trinity College in Dublin, Ireland, Political Science at the University of Salzburg, Austria, and attained a BA in music at the Liverpool Institute for Performing Arts in Liverpool, England.

He has a home in Los Angeles and is working on a book of visual poem stories for various mediums centered around the sun, nourishing food, vital music, and kind people and the evolution of all things that come and go.

=== Thomas Hien ===
Thomas Hien was born in Munich, Germany and is a singer, songwriter, composer and music producer.

His educational background includes the Liverpool Institute for Performing Arts (LIPA) where he received a Bachelor of Arts in Performing Arts, with Honors. Prior to LIPA he attended LMU Munich where he studied Political Science.

His publishing and recording deals with various publishers and record labels include Siegel, Red House Music, Seven Scores, Boar Records, Kobalt Music Group and Defend Music. In 1998 (to 1999) he joined the UK band The Managers; they released an album and toured the UK. In 1995 and 1996 he performed with multi-platinum selling artists Cliff Richard and Jennifer Rush as their guitar player on TV appearances in Germany.

== Discography ==
Vista Street Sessions – 2004 Track listing:

1. "Time To Find out"
2. "Take These Thoughts"
3. "Land of Sea"
4. "Betting On the Moon"
5. "Don't Hang Your Heart"
6. "Show Me the Way"

Land of Sea – 2006 (UK) – 2007 (US) Track listing:

1. "Land of Sea"
2. "Broken Chair"
3. "Bettin' On the Moon"
4. "You're the One I Want"
5. "Isn't That So"
6. "Don't Hang Your Heart"
7. "Take These Thoughts"
8. "Riversong"
9. "Time To Find Out"
10. "In My Time"
11. "Dreaming of Relief"
12. "Horse In the Sky" (US release only)

Resonet In Laudibus – 2009 Track listing:

1. "Resonet In Laudibus"

I Know A Way To Get Myself Free – 2010 Track listing:

1. "I Know A Way To Get Myself Free"
2. "Windows"
3. "Drunk Without Drinking"

Into The Sun – 2011 Track listing:

1. "New Light"
2. "Last Companion"
3. "Into The Sun"
4. "New Light"
5. "Bridge In The Distance"
6. "Morning Song"
7. "Incarnation Song"
8. "Traum"
9. "Till The End Of Time"
10. "Found A Place"
11. "Windows"

Seven Rivers – 2017 Track listing:

1. "This Life"
2. "Can We Lift The Darkness"
3. "Song Of My Soul"
4. "The River"
5. "Statik"
6. "Life Is What You Call Her"

The Bootlegs, Vol.1 – 2018 Track listing:

1. "Calling Me"
2. "Take These Thoughts"
3. "Show Me The Way"
4. "These Are The Days"
5. "You're The One I Want"
6. "Broken Chair"
7. "Land of Sea"
8. "Riversong"
9. "Time To Find Out"

Rooms of Light and Wonder – 2018 Track listing:

1. "Quantum Prayer"
2. "Rooms of Light and Wonder"
3. "Going Home"
4. "Water and Stones"

Time of Times – 2019 Track listing:

1. "Love Is Calling"
2. "On A Day Like This"
3. "Open The Door"
4. "Time of Times"
5. "Up In The Air"
6. "Save Me"

== Awards ==
Independent Music Awards (2005) – Best Americana – Song for "Take These Thoughts"
