= Sounds Eclectic: The Covers Project =

Compilation album by Various artists
- Released: March 13, 2007
- Recorded: June 2001–April 2006
- Label: Hear Music

Professional ratings
Review scores
Source	Rating
USA Today	3/4 stars

Sounds Eclectic: The Covers Project is a compilation album consisting of cover songs performed by a variety of artists on KCRW.

== Background ==
The recordings come from "Sounds Eclectic", a weekly syndicated public radio program hosted by Nic Harcourt that plays a variety of music, taken from the archives of the daily KCRW program Morning Becomes Eclectic. One exception is The Flaming Lips' performance of Radiohead's "Knives Out", which was recorded in their tour bus on the way to the studio. The album was sold exclusively at select Starbucks locations (Los Angeles, New York City, San Francisco, San Diego, Austin, Boston, and Washington, D.C.) starting March 13, 2007. A portion of sales helped the station's effort to digitize its music library.

== Track listing ==
#	Song	Performer	Original artist	Length	Recorded
1.	"Out on the Weekend"	Girls in Hawaii	Neil Young	3:30	4/19/06
2.	"I Go to Sleep"	Sia	The Applejacks	2:58	1/10/06
3.	"Crazy in Love"	The Magic Numbers	Beyoncé	4:08	11/01/05
4.	"Creep"	Damien Rice	Radiohead	4:04	1/24/03
5.	"I Want a Little Sugar in My Bowl"	Nikka Costa	Nina Simone	2:11	5/23/05
6.	"Fire and Rain"	Dido	James Taylor	3:18	8/14/03
7.	"Wishing on a Star"	Paul Weller	Rose Royce	3:34	9/12/05
8.	"Harvest"	Rufus Wainwright with Chris Stills	Neil Young	3:18	9/29/03
9.	"Gentle on My Mind"	R.E.M.	John Hartford	2:19	6/12/01
10.	"Mad World"	Gary Jules and Mike Andrews	Tears for Fears	3:06	4/26/04
11.	"Knives Out"	The Flaming Lips	Radiohead	4:20	8/08/02
12.	"Black Dog"	Robert Plant	Led Zeppelin	4:48	3/16/05
13.	"Moses"	Missy Higgins	Patty Griffin	3:00	6/16/05
14.	"Let's Dance"	M. Ward	David Bowie	4:52	5/06/04
15.	"Hallelujah"	k.d. lang	Leonard Cohen	5:04	7/27/04

== Personnel ==
- John Baggot – keyboards
- Teddy Borowiecki – piano, accordion
- Andy Brohard – assistant engineer
- Heather Brown – backing vocals
- Chris Bruce – guitar (acoustic), bass
- Peter Buck – guitar, mandolin
- Denyse Buffman – viola
- Jamie Candiloro – engineer
- Larry Corbett – cello
- Nikka Costa – vocals
- Wayne Coyne – guitar (acoustic), vocals
- Steve Cradock – guitar
- Ryan Cross – cello
- Josh Cunningham – guitar (acoustic)
- Shawn Davis – bass
- Vinicius Felix de Miranda – guitar
- Joel Derouin – fiddle, violin
- Mario Diaz – engineer, editing
- Dido – vocals
- Craig Doubet – engineer
- Steven Drozd –guitar, keyboards, vocals
- Brandon Duncan – engineer
- Charles Floyd – conductor
- Danny Frankel – drums
- Sia – vocals
- Angela Gannon – percussion, vocals, melodica
- Sean Gannon – drums
- Adam Grace – keyboards
- Ray Guarna – engineer
- Lisa Hannigan – vocals
- Nic Harcourt – producer, liner notes
- Missy Higgins – guitar, piano, vocals
- Daniel Huffman – keyboards
- Michael Ivins – bass, keyboards
- Gary Jules – guitar (acoustic), vocals
- Greg Kurstin – keyboards
- k.d. lang – vocals
- Mark LeCorre – engineer
- Greg Leisz – guitar
- Joshua "Trumpet Solo" Lopez – guitar, backing vocals
- Adam MacDougall – keyboards, backing vocals
- Ed Maxwell – bass
- Ariana Morgenstern – producer
- Jared Nugent – assistant engineer
- David Palmer – keyboards
- David Piltch – bass
- Robert Plant – vocals
- Damien Rice – guitar, vocals
- Michelle Richards – violin
- Marcelino Sanchez – intern
- Jacob Sciba – assistant engineer
- Al Sgro – percussion, backing vocals
- Chris Stills – guitar, vocals
- Michael Stipe – vocals
- Romeo Stodart – guitar, piano, vocals
- Skin Tyson – guitar
- Rufus Wainwright – guitar, piano, vocals
- Matt Ward – guitar, harmonica, piano, vocals
- Joey Waronker – drums
- Paul John Weller – guitar, vocals
- Jason Wormer – engineer
