= Jeff L. Lieberman =

American director, screenwriter, and producer

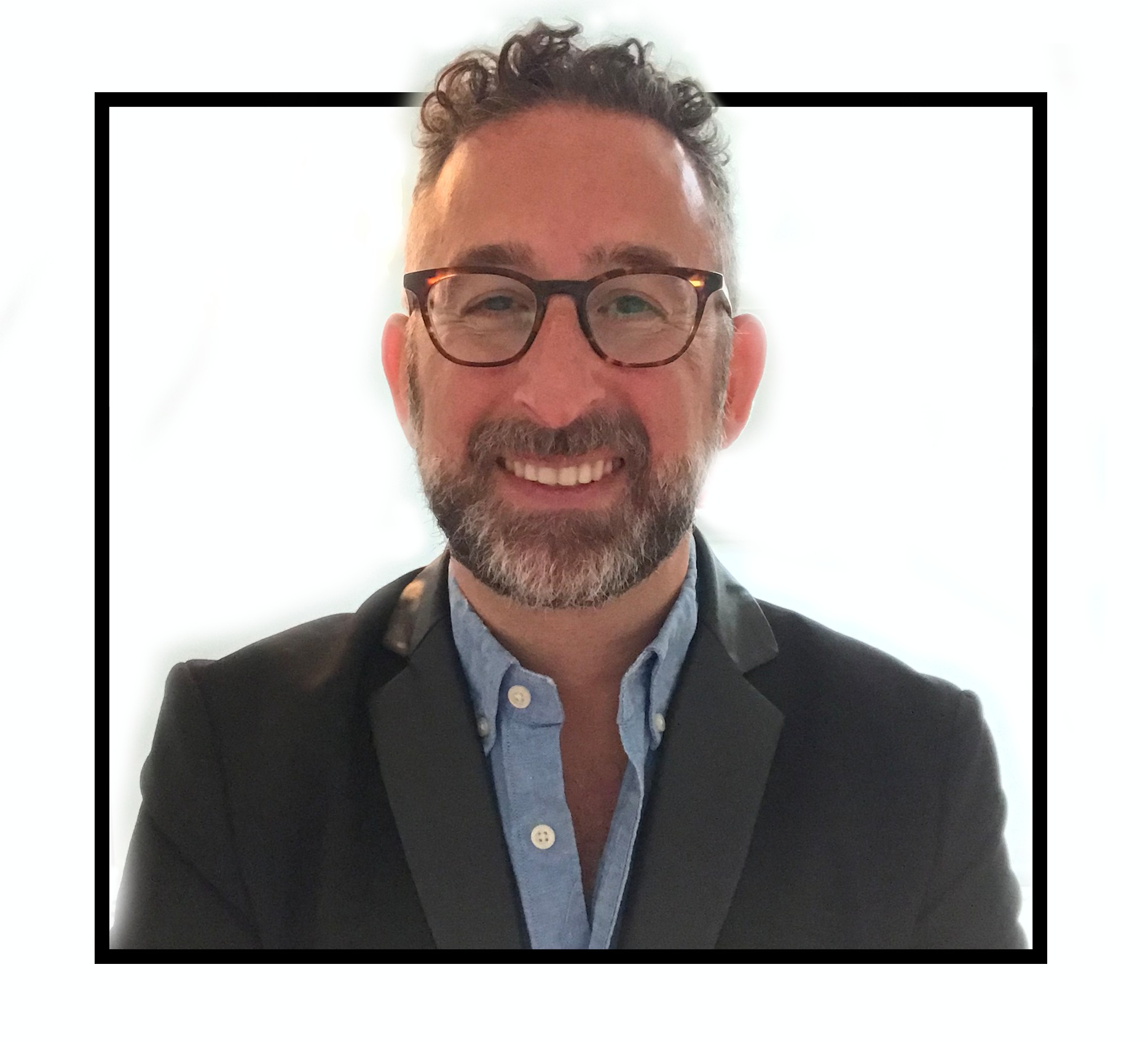
- Born: March 30, 1978 (age 48); Vancouver, British Columbia, Canada
- Education: Ryerson University; UCLA; Prince of Wales Secondary School
- Occupation: Filmmaker
- Notable work: The Amazing Nina Simone
- Website: www.re-emergingfilms.com

Jeff L. Lieberman is a film director, screenwriter and producer of both narrative and documentary films. He is the founder of Re-Emerging Films and the filmmaker of Bella!, The Amazing Nina Simone, Re-Emerging: The Jews of Nigeria. Bella! was a joint winner of the 2022 Library of Congress Lavine/Ken Burns Prize for Film.

== Early life ==
Lieberman was born in Vancouver, British Columbia and is a graduate of The Mini School at Prince of Wales Secondary School, Ryerson University’s RTA School of Media, and UCLA's Professional Program in Producing. Lieberman’s first training in tv/film was through Vancouver’s community access TV program, The Complaint Department, which he helped produce for several years while in high school. He also received theatrical training during a summer at Stagedoor Manor in New York's Catskill Mountains.

== Journalism ==
While in college, Lieberman interned at Business News Network, The Mike Bullard Show, Pearson Television in London, and at KGTV, the ABC Affiliate in San Diego, California. An internship with CNN brought Lieberman to the network's New York Bureau, working directly with Maria Hinojosa and Rose Arce, where during the last month of 1999, they covered stories on the impending Y2K technical glitch, the changing demographics of America in the year 2000, and the events surrounding the trials of four NYPD officers charged in the murder of Amadou Diallo.

Lieberman went on to write, produce and edit news stories at CBS News and The New York Post, where he covered events all over New York and Washington, DC, including the Obama inauguration, The Times Square terrorist attack, New York's Fashion Week and the 10-year anniversary of the September 11 attacks. Speaking to LGBT Weekly, he told them: "I'm a journalist at heart and hope that my films invite people to consider situations in different ways and provoke them into action."

== Film and television career ==
From 2002–2008, Lieberman was the Senior Producer of Hurwitz Creative, producing behind-the-scenes documentaries on the making of films, including Ratatouille, The Incredibles, The Chronicles of Narnia, Charlie and The Chocolate Factory, Troy, I, Robot, and The Bucket List. Lieberman interviewed actors, directors, producers and crafts people, producing programs that aired on HBO, Fox, Starz, Discovery Channel, and the DVDs of films from Warner Bros, Disney, 20th Century Fox, Sony Pictures and Lionsgate. In 2022, Lieberman joined CNN as a Senior Producer in the new documentary unit created for the short-lived CNN+. During that period, Lieberman led a team in the creation of a documentary film on the proliferation of copyright lawsuits in the music industry. Taking on Taylor Swift had a 2022 primetime broadcast on CNN and received a 2023 Emmy nomination.

For his first independent feature, Lieberman wrote, directed, produced, filmed and edited the 2013 documentary, Re-Emerging: The Jews of Nigeria. Lieberman journeyed around Nigeria, operating as a one-man crew, meeting Jewish communities throughout Nigeria. The film centers around one young Igbo man named Shmuel, and his quest to find "the true Judaism." The film debuted in 2013, opening at New York's Quad Cinema and in LA at Laemmle Theatres. It was also shown at film festivals in Washington DC, Boston, Toronto, Vancouver, Israel and Switzerland.

Lieberman established Re-Emerging Films in 2007, at the outset of his first documentary feature. Lieberman named his company after his first feature: Re-Emerging: The Jews of Nigeria. Through Re-Emerging Films, Lieberman produced three feature documentaries, two TV pilots (Beauty Queens, Mario The Magician) and hours of content for Disney, Coca-Cola, Wine Enthusiast Magazine, Elsevier, Marlo Thomas and Showtime's Homeland. Lieberman also co-produced the pro-Obama election video, "Call Your Zeyde".

Lieberman has said that he is a longtime fan of Nina Simone, discovering her music while in high-school. In 2012, Lieberman visited Simone's hometown of Tryon, North Carolina to research the musician. He met many of the men and women that grew up with Simone (then named Eunice Waymon), and began the journey to reconstruct the story of the often misunderstood singer, songwriter and civil rights activist. Lieberman interviewed over 50 of Simone's friends, family, band members, lovers, and fellow activists, including Nikki Giovanni, Eric Burdon of The Animals, Chuck Stewart, Billy Vera, Horace Ott, Lester Hyman, Tom Schnabel, Roscoe Dellums, Marie-Christine Dunham Pratt and Sam Waymon, Nina's brother and longtime band member. The film debuted in cinemas in October 2015 and has since played over 100 theatres in 10 countries, being described by The Hollywood Reporter as "frequently dry but comes packed with performance footage".

In March 2015, Lieberman weighed in on the casting of Zoe Saldaña as Nina Simone for the separate bio-film, Nina. In a guest column in The Hollywood Reporter, Lieberman stated that he found the script and trailer of the film to offer an "ugly and inaccurate portrayal." Lieberman stated that the sensationalized script was one of the reasons he made his documentary film, in order to counter the dramatic liberties used in the telling of Simone's story in other films. The article was also re-published in People Magazine, The Huffington Post, The Root, BET, and Complex.

In 2016, Lieberman announced the completion of his first feature screenplay, entitled My Harlem, written in response to an anti-gay Harlem church. Lieberman launched a crowd-funding campaign for the project. Lieberman says he also wrote the film because "I am a gay man who hardly ever sees my life and dreams on film. I want to see a beautiful, romantic love story between two men that is based in reality with the challenges of dating and relationships but without the pitfalls of dramatic gay tragedy."

Lieberman's 2023 film, Bella!, chronicled the political career of Congresswoman Bella Abzug, with The New York Times calling it a film that "illustrates the merciless challenges of electoral endurance even for the fiercest fighter." The film opened in theatres in August 2023 and continued to tour throughout 2024. Bella! was nominated for Best Documentary Screenplay at The 76th Writers Guild of America Awards, and was selected as joint winner of The Library of Congress Lavine/Ken Burns Prize for Film at an awards ceremony at The Library of Congress in October 2022. The award is a finishing grant designed to help filmmakers with completion funding.

== Filmography ==
Year	Film	Role	Genre	Awards
2007	Akeelah and The Bee DVD Documentary	Director, Writer & Producer	Documentary Short	2007 Telly Award
2015	The Amazing Nina Simone	Director, Writer & Producer	Feature Documentary	Black Reel Awards for Outstanding Documentary (Nomination); Audience Choice Award - 2016 Tryon International Film Festival
2022	Taking on Taylor Swift (CNN)	Senior Producer	Television Documentary	2023 Emmy Award Nominee
2023	Bella!	Director, Writer & Producer	Feature Documentary	2024 Writers Guild Awards Nominee - Best Documentary Screenplay The Library of Congress Lavine/Ken Burns Prize for Film
TBD	My Harlem	Director, Writer & Producer	Narrative Feature Film	
