= The Amazing Nina Simone (film) =

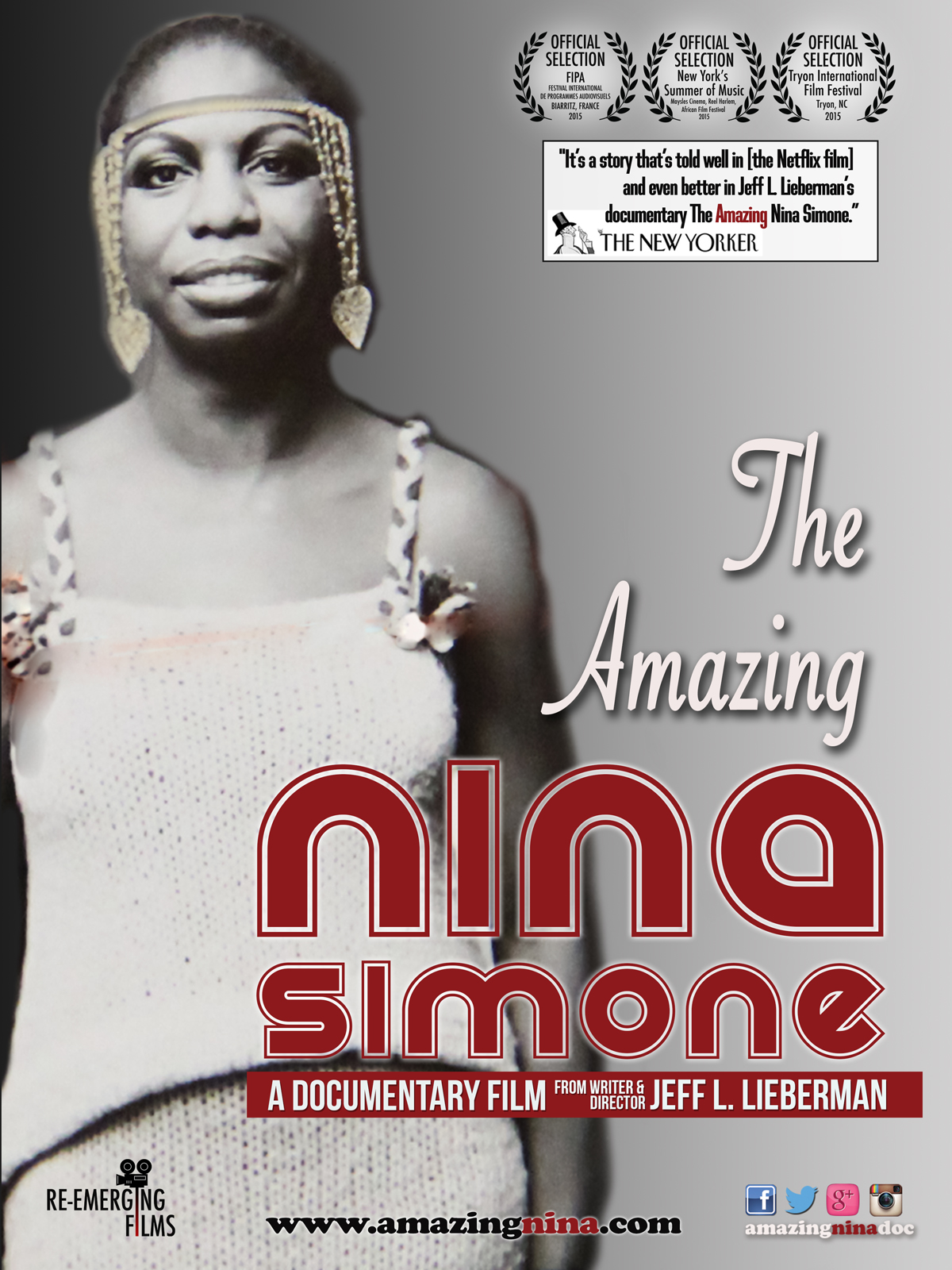
- Digital release poster
- Directed by: Jeff L. Lieberman
- Written by: Jeff L. Lieberman
- Produced by: Jeff L. Lieberman
- Starring: Nikki Giovanni, Eric Burdon, Chuck Stewart, Billy Vera, Horace Ott, Lester Hyman, Tom Schnabel, Salamishah Tillet
- Cinematography: Jeff L.Lieberman
- Edited by: Jeff L. Lieberman
- Music by: Tenny Whyte
- Production company: Re-Emerging Films
- Distributed by: Re-Emerging Films
- Release date: October 15, 2015 (Worldwide)
- Running time: 105 minutes
- Country: United States
- Language: English

The Amazing Nina Simone is a 2015 American documentary film by director Jeff L. Lieberman. The film details the life, legacy and musical accomplishments of singer, musician, pianist, songwriter and Civil Rights activist, Nina Simone, through interviews with over 50 of her friends, family, band members, lovers and fellow activists. The film has been called the best of the three Nina Simone films by The New Yorker, and "The Nina Simone film we should all be watching" by Blavity.

== Synopsis ==
The film traces Nina Simone through the many decades of her life, including growing up as Eunice Waymon, a piano prodigy in Tryon, NC, attending a summer program at The Juilliard School in New York and facing her first rejection from the Curtis Institute of Music in Philadelphia. There, she went on to play piano at a bar in Atlantic City, and when forced to sing, she discovered her distinctive style that caught the attention of Bethlehem Records. It was there that she became known with her hit song, an interpretation of George Gershwin's "I Loves You, Porgy", and became a unique voice that was typically called jazz, but combined elements of classical, folk, pop, gospel, hymns, African, Jewish music and more. As the film recounts, she would ultimately use her musical voice to protest the inequality and brutality of segregation and American racism through songs like "Mississippi Goddam", "To Be Young, Gifted and Black", "Four Women (song)", the Kurt Weill standard "Pirate Jenny" and many more. The film is told through the stories and memories of Nikki Giovanni, Eric Burdon of The Animals, Chuck Stewart, Billy Vera, Horace Ott, Lester Hyman, Tom Schnabel, Roscoe Dellums, Marie-Christine Dunham Pratt and Sam Waymon, Nina's brother and longtime band member.

== Production ==
Jeff L. Lieberman has said he wanted to make a documentary about Nina Simone because he was a fan of her music since discovering her in high school. He visited Tryon, NC, while touring with his previous film, Re-Emerging: The Jews of Nigeria and met several men and women who grew up with Nina in their small, Southern town. He approached Nina's three surviving brothers, and several of her longtime band members, including Al Schackman, Lisle Atkinson, Emile Latimer, Gene Perla, and Leopoldo Fleming, all of whom endorsed the project and participated in the research and telling of the story.

== Release ==
The film made its festival premiere at FIPA: Festival International De Programmes Audiovisuels in Biarritz, France, in January 2015 and had three special advance screenings in Harlem's Jackie Robinson Park, opening The Tryon International Film Festival in Tryon, NC and in Nyack, NY, home of Sam Waymon, and where much of the film was shot. The film opened in New York and Los Angeles on October 16, 2015, and nationwide on October 23, 2015.

=== Reception ===
The Amazing Nina Simone holds a 100% rating on Rotten Tomatoes based on 6 reviews. The film received reviews in The Hollywood Reporter, Jet magazine, The Seattle Times, the Chicago Reader, The Boston Globe, BroadwayWorld, and Blavity.
