= Free in the Streets =

Studio album by A.R.E. Weapons
- Released: September 20, 2005
- Genre: Electroclash
- Length: 40:51
- Label: Defend Music

A.R.E. Weapons chronology
A.R.E. Weapons (2003)	Free in the Streets (2005)	Modern Mayhem (2007)

Free in the Streets is the second studio album by American electroclash group A.R.E. Weapons, released on September 20, 2005 by Defend Music.

Professional ratings
Review scores
Source	Rating
AllMusic	2.5/5 stars
Exclaim!	(negative)
Pitchfork Media	(6.0/10)
PopMatters	2/10 stars
Punknews.org	0.5/5 stars
Robert Christgau	(dud)
Spin	D+

== Track listing ==
1. "These Tears" – 4:12
2. "Doghouse" – 3:12
3. "Push Em Back" – 3:40
4. "Hardcase" – 3:38
5. "Reggie" – 3:30
6. "Weakest Ones" – 3:40
7. "Who Rules the Wasteland?" – 3:18
8. "Last Cigarette" – 2:32
9. "Be Nice" – 3:42
10. "F.K.F" – 3:05
11. "Brand New Walking Blues" – 3:39
12. "Into the Night" – 2:51

== Personnel ==
- A.R.E. Weapons – Mixing, Primary Artist, Producer
- Jason LaFarge – Engineer, Mixing
- Brain F. McPeck – Composer, Vocals
- Paul Sevigny – Keyboards
- Arthur Winer – Mastering
