= Yenta Mash =

Yiddish-language author

- Born: Yente Roytman; 1922; Zgurița, Bessarabia, Kingdom of Romania
- Died: 2013 (aged 90–91); Haifa, Israel
- Occupation: Short story writer
- Writing career
- Language: Yiddish
- Notable awards: Hersh Segal Prize (1994), Itsik Manger Prize (1999), Dovid Hofshteyn Prize (2002)

Yenta Mash (1922 — 2013) was a Yiddish-language author from modern-day Moldova. After moving to Haifa, Mash began writing short stories based on her experiences in Bessarabia, gulags in Siberia, and as an immigrant to Israel.

== Early life ==
Mash was born Yente Roytman in 1922 in Zguritse, Bessarabia, present-day Moldova. During World War II, Mash and her family were sent to a labor camp in Siberia by Soviet forces. Mash was 19 years old, and during her time in the labor camp, she lost both of her parents. Her father died in the Ural Mountains and her mother after getting lost in the tundra near the Ob River.

Mash escaped the gulag in 1948 and moved to Chișinău, where she sold books. She married, changing her name to Yente Mash. At the time, Chișinău was a center of Jewish literary life, and Mash befriended other Jewish literary figures like Yekhiel Shraybman, Yankl Yakir, and Motl Sakzier. She developed the desire to start writing her own stories. However, due to her undocumented status and lack of papers, Mash was afraid to write and face possible repercussions.

== Literary career ==
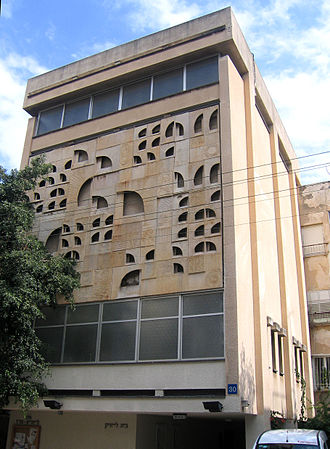
Leivik House, a cultural center in Tel Aviv that Mash was a member of

In the 1970s, after Soviet Moldovan Jews were allowed to immigrate to Israel, Mash moved to Haifa. Mash then began writing stories, now in her 50s. She wrote in her native language, Yiddish, and occasionally, Russian.

In Israel, Yiddish was looked down on as a symbol of European oppression of the Jews. Mash's decision to write in Yiddish, rather than the more widespread Hebrew, was Mash's way to honor her family and culture. As a Yiddish language author in Israel, Mash maintained strong relationships with other Israeli Yiddish authors like Mordechai Tsanin, Rivka Basman Ben-Hayim, and Michael Lev.

Mash drew on her own personal experiences for her work. In her stories, she wrote about life in the Soviet Union, adjusting to Israeli life as an ex-Soviet woman, and life in 1940s gulags. She was a member of Leyvik House, a cultural center promoting literature in Tel Aviv.

Ellen Cassedy is the main translator of Mash's works into English. In 2016, Cassedy won a PEN/Heim Translation Fund Grant to translate a collection of Mash's short stories into English. She translated Mash's work while a fellow at the Yiddish Book Center.

== Awards and honors ==
- Hersh Segal Prize (1994)
- Itsik Manger Prize (1999)
- Dovid Hofshteyn Prize (2002)

== Works ==
- On the Landing: Stories, translated by Ellen Cassedy
- Mit der letster hakofe (transl. The Last Time Around), 2007, translated by Ellen Cassedy
  - A Seder in the Taiga
