= 9to5: The Story of a Movement =

- Official poster
- Directed by: Julia Reichert; Steven Bognar
- Produced by: Julia Reichert; Steven Bognar
- Cinematography: Steven Bognar
- Edited by: Jaime Meyers Schlenck
- Music by: Wendy Blackstone
- Production companies: Chicken & Egg Pictures; Dobkin Family Foundation; Fork Films; Massachusetts Foundation for the Humanities; Ohio Humanities Council; The Better Angels Society; National Endowment for the Arts
- Distributed by: PBS Distribution
- Release dates: June 19, 2020 (AFI Docs); February 1, 2021 (United States)
- Running time: 89 minutes
- Country: United States
- Language: English

9to5: The Story of a Movement is a 2020 American documentary film directed and produced by Julia Reichert and Steven Bognar. The film revolves around 9to5, an organization established to improve working conditions and ensuring the rights of women and families.

The film had its world premiere at AFI Docs on June 19, 2020. It was released on February 1, 2021, by PBS Distribution.

== Synopsis ==
The film follows the 9to5 movement, an organization established to improve working conditions and ensuring the rights of women and families.

== Cast ==
- Karen Nussbaum
- Ellen Cassedy
- Mary Jung
- Jane Fonda
- Lane Windham
- Verna Barksdale
- Kim Cook
- Debbie Schneider
- Carol Sims
- Anne Hill
- Jackie Harris
- Adair Dammann

== Release ==
The film was initially set to premiere at South by Southwest in March 2020, however, the festival was cancelled due to the COVID-19 pandemic. Instead, the film had its world premiere at AFI Docs on June 19, 2020. The film also screened at DOC NYC on November 11, 2020. In December 2020, PBS Distribution acquired U.S. distribution rights to the film, and set it for a February 1, 2021, broadcast as part of its Independent Lens program.

== Critical reception ==
9to5: The Story of a Movement received positive reviews from film critics. It holds a 100% approval rating on review aggregator website Rotten Tomatoes, based on 13 reviews, with an average of 7.2/10, and was nominated for a 2021 Peabody Award.
