= Debbie Schneider =

American labor organizer

- Born: Deborah Schneider

Debbie Schneider is a labor organizer who has worked with multiple groups including 9to5, Women Office Workers, and United Healthcare Workers. She served as president of District 925 of the Service Employees International Union (SEIU) and was a member of SEIU's executive board.

== Early life and career ==
Schneider's mother was a high school English teacher, and her dad was a corporate tax attorney. Her mother was part of a labor union and influenced Schneider's thoughts and opinions on activism. Influenced by her mother, Schneider went to college to major in Literature which later inspired her to move into journalism. After graduating college, she became a clerical worker at Cahner's Publishing company, where she tabulated market survey results. Subsequently she joined the staff of the New York-based Women Office Workers. Schneider was a college student working for a magazine when she first heard about 9to5, and she attended her first 9to5 meeting in 1978. The 9to5 movement was originally started by a group of office workers in Boston, especially Karen Nussbaum and Ellen Cassedy, as a way to discuss work-related issues that gathered women from different fields to center on improving their workplace environment. Schneider's role in 9to5 was one of the topics presented in the 2020 documentary film 9to5: The Story of a Movement. In 1993, when Nussbaum left to work at the Department of Labor as the head of the Working Women's Bureau, Schneider became the national president of the district 925 union.

In 1995 Schneider was named president of District 925 of the Service Employees International Union, and was later elected to SEIU's executive board. In June 2001 Schneider was appointed a trustee of SEIU, and she was appointed to serve as trustee for Service Employees International Union, Local 585, at the end of 2001. In 2004 Schneider was head of the global partnerships within SEIU.

== Activism ==
Schneider is best known for her work with clerical workers at the University of Cincinnati. The union led by Schneider, District 925, lost their first vote for unionization in June 1986 by 29 votes, but a second vote in 1988 passed leading to the successful establishment of a union for the University of Cincinnati workers. During the events at the University of Cincinnati, Schneider coordinated strikes where union members walked off the job. By 1990 the university had settled with the workers.

Schneider has worked with multiple groups to help them establish unions including library staff, Head Start workers, hospital workers, and workers for the City of Chicago. She has also spoken as an advocate for workers with respect to employment and pay equity. Schneider has also spoken against changes proposed in the Ohio legislature that would make is harder for clerical workers, who are primarily women, to prove their injuries were related to their occupation.
