= Bella! =

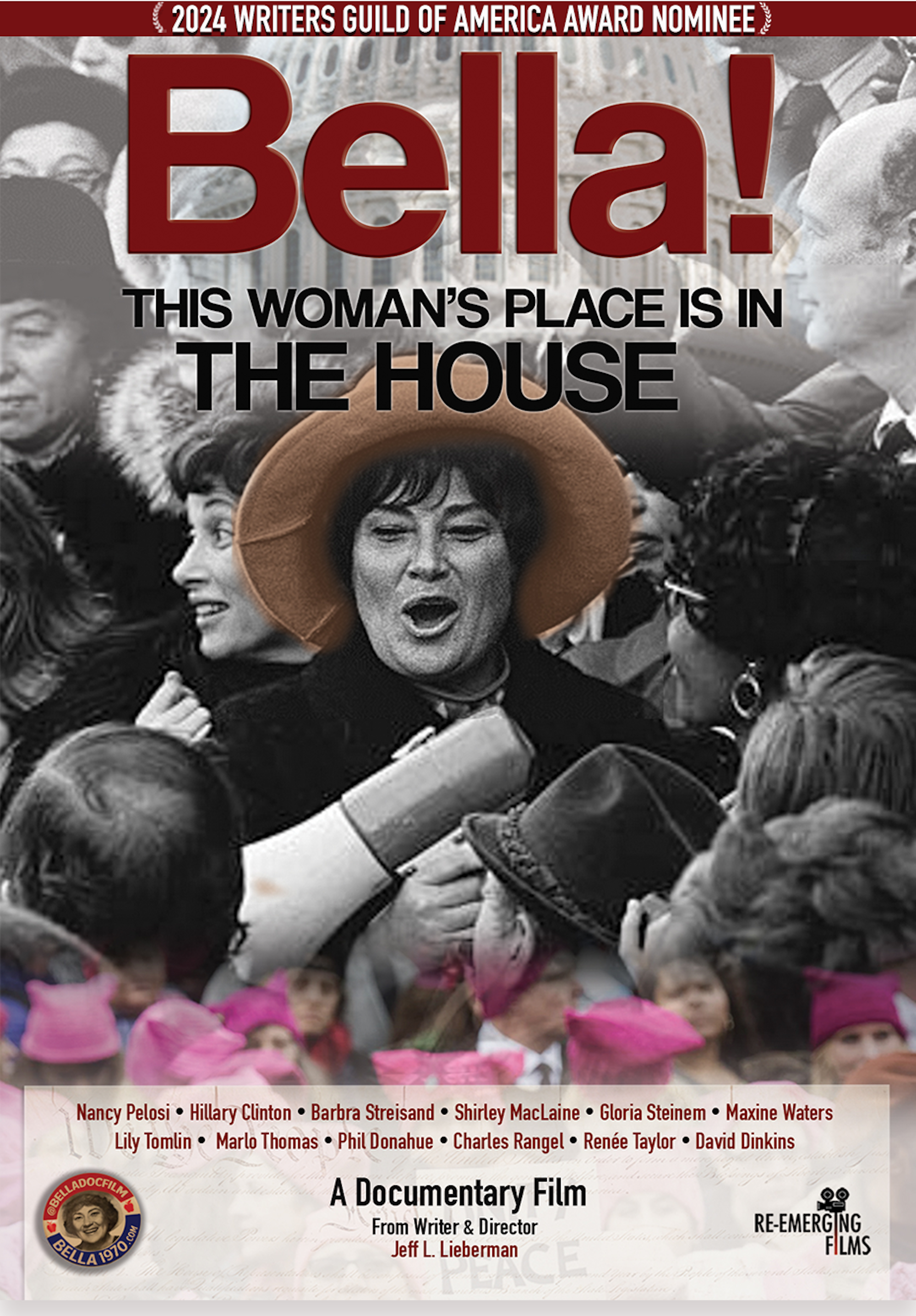
- Official poster
- Directed by: Jeff L. Lieberman
- Written by: Jeff L. Lieberman
- Produced by: Jeff L. Lieberman; Jamila C. Fairley
- Starring: Barbra Streisand; Shirley MacLaine; Hillary Clinton; Lily Tomlin; Nancy Pelosi; Gloria Steinem; Maxine Waters; Phil Donahue; Marlo Thomas; Charles Rangel; David Dinkins; Renée Taylor
- Cinematography: Jeff L. Lieberman
- Edited by: Jeff L. Lieberman
- Music by: The Flat Nasty
- Production company: Re-Emerging Films
- Distributed by: Re-Emerging Films
- Release date: August 23, 2023 (Worldwide)
- Running time: 102 minutes
- Country: United States
- Language: English

Bella! is a 2023 American documentary film by director Jeff L. Lieberman. It chronicles the political career of the American politician and activist Bella Abzug. The film opened in select theatres in August 2023 and has continued to tour throughout 2024. The film features interviews with Barbra Streisand, Shirley MacLaine, Hillary Clinton, Lily Tomlin, Nancy Pelosi, Gloria Steinem, Maxine Waters, Phil Donahue, Marlo Thomas, Charles Rangel, David Dinkins and Renée Taylor.

Bella! was nominated for Best Documentary Screenplay by the 76th Writers Guild of America Awards and was selected as one of two winners of The Library of Congress Lavine/Ken Burns Prize for Film at an awards ceremony at The Library of Congress in October 2022. The award is a finishing grant designed to help filmmakers with completion funding.

== Release ==
Bella! opened at New York's Village East Cinema on August 18, 2023, with a premiere that included Renée Taylor, Carolyn Maloney, Gale Brewer, Scott Stringer, David Belafonte, Allen Roskoff and Irene Natividad. NYC Mayor Eric Adams issued an official city proclamation calling August 18, 2023 "Bella Abzug Day", writing "I am pleased to join Harlem-based Re-Emerging Films for the world premiere of its new documentary film, Bella!, which explores the remarkable life and accomplishments of the late Bella Abzug, the trailblazing congress member from New York City."

The film's first advance screening was at San Francisco's Castro Theatre with Nancy Pelosi in attendance. The film was the closing night film of The San Francisco Jewish Film Festival.

Bella!'s Canadian premiere was at the Park Theatre (Vancouver) on October 15, 2023. Vancouver Mayor Ken Sim issued an official proclamation to mark the event, stating that Bella! "explores the remarkable life and accomplishments of the late Bella Abzug, the trailblazing activist, feminist, congress member, and global advocate for equality."

== Original song ==
The film's final song is a specially composed anthem for Bella! called "The Easy Way". It is written and composed by Mark W. Hornburg and Doug Jervey. It is performed by Ansley Stewart and The Flat Nasty. The song features lyrics that reflect Bella Abzug's own relentless determination: "I could feel defeated now / I could be broken-hearted / I could be finished long before I'd even started / But that would be too easy and I never take the easy way." The song was one of 94 songs to qualify for the 2024 Academy Awards.

== Reception ==
Bella! holds a 100% rating on Rotten Tomatoes based on 5 reviews. The Alliance of Women Film Journalists selected Bella! as their Movie of the Week, with critic Loren King calling it "Enlightening, passionate, nostalgic and endlessly riveting." Film Critic, Nicolas Rapold of The New York Times wrote "Her never-say-die advocacy still inspires, but the film also illustrates the merciless challenges of electoral endurance even for the fiercest fighter." On Larry Mantle's FilmWeek on 89.3 KPCC, Film Critic, Lael Lowenstein called Bella! "very well-researched and thoroughly engaging."

=== Accolades ===
| Award | Date of ceremony | Category | Recipient(s) and nominee(s) | Result | Ref. |
|---|---|---|---|---|---|
| The Library of Congress Lavine/Ken Burns Prize for Film | October 18, 2022 | Best Documentary Film | Bella! | Won (Note: Tied with Philly on Fire.) | |
| Writers Guild of America Awards | April 14, 2024 | Best Documentary Screenplay | Jeff L. Lieberman | Nominated | |
| Alliance of Women Film Journalists | August 18, 2023 | Movie of The Week | Bella! | Won | |
| Teaneck International Film Festival | November 17, 2023 | 2023 Audience Award: Best Of Festival | Bella! | Won | |
| Teaneck International Film Festival | November 17, 2023 | 2023 Audience Award: Best Documentary | Bella! | Won | |
| San Diego International Jewish Film Festival | January 11, 2024 | Audience Award - Best Documentary Feature | Bella! | Won (Note: Third Place.) | |
| Tryon International Film Festival | November 24, 2024 | 2024 Best Full-Length Documentary | Bella! | Won | |
