= A.R.E. Weapons =

American electroclash band

- Origin: New York City, U.S.
- Genres: Sass, electroclash
- Years active: 1999–present
- Labels: Rough Trade, Defend, Weapons
- Members: Brain F. McPeck; Matthew McAuley; Paul Sevigny; Erik Rapin
- Past members: Thomas Bullock; Ryan Noel
- Website: areweapons.com

A.R.E. Weapons is an American electroclash band from New York City. The band was formed in 1999 by Matthew McAuley, Brain F. McPeck, and Ryan Noel. Their live shows are noted for their aggressiveness and confrontational style. Early reviewers placed them in the no wave category.

Rough Trade was encouraged to sign the band after Pulp's Jarvis Cocker heard them live. A.R.E. Weapons released two singles, "Street Gang" and "New York Muscle", in 2001. Before the release of their self-titled 2003 album, synthesizer player Thomas Bullock was replaced by their manager Paul Sevigny (brother of actress Chloë Sevigny). Guitarist Ryan Noel died in 2004 of a heroin overdose. The remaining members recorded their second album, Free in the Streets, which was released in 2005.

Matthew McAuley and Brian McPeck went on to form the band T.V. Baby and in 2017 released the album "Dignity Don't Dance" on Deus Records. McAuley then went on to play in the Brion Starr band and began his own solo career. Paul Sevingny went on to operate a conglomerate of clubs in downtown New York City.

== Members ==
- Matthew McAuley – bassist
- Brain F. McPeck – vocalist
- Paul Sevigny – synthesizer
- Erik Rapin – drums

=== Former members ===
- Thomas Bullock – synthesizer
- Ryan Noel (aka 'Rylo Nolo') – guitarist (deceased)

Timeline

== Discography ==
=== Albums ===
- A.R.E. Weapons – April 1, 2003
- Free in the Streets – September 20, 2005
- Keys Money Cigarettes – March 21, 2006
- Modern Mayhem – September 11, 2007
- Darker Blue – November 11, 2009

=== Singles ===
- Street Gang – July 2001 – UK #73
- New York Muscle – November 2001
- Hey World – May 27, 2003

There was also a four track sampler EP released in the UK, with the tracks; "Don't Be Scared", "Fuck You Pay Me", "Headbanger Face" and "Black Mercedes".
