= Mordechai Tsanin =

- מרדכי צאנין
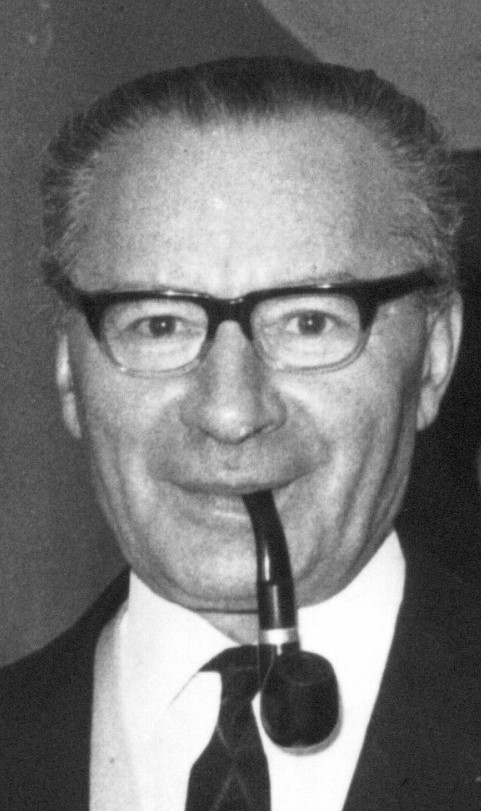
- Born: Mordechai Yeshayahu Cukierman; 1 April 1906; Sokołów Podlaski, Russian Empire
- Died: 4 February 2009 (aged 102); Israel
- Occupations: Journalist, novelist, lexicographer

Mordechai Tsanin (Yiddish: מרדכי צאנין; Hebrew: מרדכי צאנין; 1 April 1906 – 4 February 2009) was a Yiddish language writer, journalist and lexicographer and a leading figure in post-war Israeli Yiddish culture.

== Early life ==
Tsanin was born Mordechai Yeshayahu Cukierman, in the town of Sokołów Podlaski in the Russian Empire (today in Poland). His father's occupation, practiced in nearby Siedlce, was that of writing petitions to the government on behalf of private citizens, while his mother worked in the family home.

His formal education began in Heder and Yeshiva (roughly, the elementary and high schools of traditional Jewish education). When the family relocated to Warsaw, in 1921, he embarked on secular studies, at a Polish gymnasium.

As a young man, his politics leaned towards the Bund, a Jewish Socialist party. Of the Zionist enterprise he took a dim view: as he told an interviewer many years later, "Heint and Moment [Jewish newspapers in pre-war Warsaw], were, for me, treif; they were Zionist."

== World War 2 ==
At the outbreak of World War II, Tsanin served in the Polish army. With Poland defeated, he returned home to Warsaw. After two months, he fled to Lithuania with his family, from where he saw them off to Mandatory Palestine. He remained in Lithuania through the Soviet takeover in 1940, soon after which he obtained a Japanese visa. From Japan he went to Shanghai and from there back west, aiming at Mandatory Palestine, which he reached in 1941 via India and finally Egypt.

In late 1945, Tsanin returned to Poland on a year-long fact-finding mission as correspondent for the New York Yiddish daily Forward. What he found there was published in the Forward, republished in every major Yiddish newspaper worldwide, and finally collected in book form as Iber shteyn un shtok: a rayze iber hundert khorev gevorene kehiles in Poyln (Yiddish: איבער שטיין און שטאָק: אַ רײַזע איבער הונדערט חרוב געוואָרענע קהילות אין פּוילן, English: "Of Stones and Ruins: a journey through one hundred destroyed communities in Poland"). The mission ended prematurely when it came to the attention of the Polish authorities, who expressed their displeasure with Tsanin's emphasis on the negative, compelling him to quit the country promptly.

== Civic affairs ==
For the rest of his life, Tsanin lived in Tel Aviv where, apart from his literary pursuits, he was active in civic affairs. He co-founded Beit Leivick (named for the writer Leivick Halpern), the headquarters for the Israeli association of Yiddish journalists and a center for everything Yiddish in Tel Aviv. Tsanin headed that association of Yiddish journalists for many years, and also served as president of an international association of Jewish journalists.

== Journalism ==
His first published works — chiefly short stories and journalism — appeared in Warsaw beginning in 1929. His outlets included the periodicals Oifgang (Yiddish: אויפגאנג, English: "Dawn"), Naie Volkszeitung (Yiddish: נאיע פאלקסצייטונג, English: "New popular newspaper"), and Literarische Wochenschriften (Yiddish: ליטערארישע וואכנשריפטן, English: "Literary weekly"). In addition, he edited a book review insert, Bucherwelt (Yiddish: ביכערוועלט, English: "Book world").

In July 1948, after seven years in Israel, he founded a Yiddish weekly, Illustrierter Wochenblatt (Yiddish: אילוסטרירטער וואכנבלאט, English: "Illustrated Weekly"). It ran until October 1949 and was immediately succeeded by the publication for which he is best-known, Lezte Neies (Yiddish: לעצטע נייעס, English: "Latest News"). This, founded with two partners, began also as a weekly, soon went to thrice-weekly and finally in 1957 to daily.

Though a big success in terms of circulation (daily runs of 20–30,000), financial difficulties led Tsanin, in 1960, to sell Lezte Neies to Pirsumim (Hebrew: פרסומים), a news conglomerate owned by the Mapai party. There is, however, another theory for why Tsanin sold Lezte Neies to Mapai: he knew that his ideas would stir up party operatives, which would force them to think about his ideas.

Though no longer the owner, and despite sharp political differences with Mapai and its successor, the Labor Party, Tsanin remained editor-in-chief until his retirement from journalism in 1977.

In parallel with Lezte Neies, Tsanin founded Tsanins Illustrierte Welt (Yiddish: צאנינס אילוסטרירטע וועלט, English: "Tsanin's illustrated world"), a magazine covering news, the arts, theater, movies and fashion. Naming it for himself was a bid to capitalize on his fame. This operated from 1968 to 1975.

Lezte Neies itself kept on after Tsanin's retirement until 2006 when it succumbed, as had all its competitors already, to the dwindling population of Yiddish speakers in Israel.

== Books ==
Tsanin's first published book appeared in 1935, in Poland. It was a collection of stories, Vivat Leben (Yiddish: וויוואט לעבען, English: "To life!"). Two years later he published his first novel, Oif Sumpiker Erd (Yiddish: אויף זומפיקער ערד, English: "On Swampy Ground").

He authored some twenty more books, with a few translated to English, Hebrew and French but the lion's share as yet available only in the original Yiddish. The account of his post-war mission to Poland has been noted above. Among his other books, especially notable is the story of his long war-time flight through the USSR, the Far East, India, Egypt and finally to Israel, Grenezen bis zum Himmel (Yiddish: גרענעצן ביז צום הימל, English: "Borders all the way to the sky"), 1970. His biggest literary work is Yiddish: ארטפנוס קומט צוריק אהיים, translated to English as Artapanos Comes Home, (Gazelle Book Services Ltd, 1980) an epic six-volume work that follows the eponymous hero's family through the Jewish people's 1900-year exile.

As of 2014, the University of California, Berkeley, library holds nine distinct Tsanin books. These include novels, reflections on the condition of the Jewish people, collected essays, and a dictionary. The dictionary is notable as the first Yiddish-Hebrew (and Hebrew-Yiddish) dictionary that reflects modern Hebrew usage. Reviews of it, however, have been mixed. In the words of one reviewer, "The author was a journalist and not a linguist or possessed of any deep knowledge of historical linguistics or of Yiddish itself, and his dictionary reflects that fact: each entry and its translation, nothing more." To be fair, that reviewer has little good to say about any extant Yiddish-Hebrew dictionaries.

== Yiddish politics and controversy ==
At the beginning of the twentieth century, three languages competed for the loyalty of modernizing Jews in Eastern Europe: Russian, Yiddish and Hebrew. The Zionist movement lined up behind Hebrew, and after the establishment of the State of Israel made establishing Hebrew among the many new immigrants a top priority. Yiddish was viewed as a threat to the nation's unity, and the early Israeli state's uncertain commitment to press freedom provided a tool. Thus, in 1949, when Tsanin wished to convert Lezte Neies from a weekly to a daily, he had to apply with the government for permission. Permission was granted to go to a three-day-a week format, but no further. Tsanin evaded this stricture by establishing a second thrice-weekly newspaper, Heintike Naies (Yiddish: האינטיקע נאייעס, English: "Daily News") and arranged to have that and Lezte Neies published on alternate days. The authorities chose to look the other way on that, and finally approved Lezte Neies for daily format in 1957.

It would be wrong to describe the government's attitude to Yiddish, even early on, as uniformly hostile. The Israeli army itself ordered copies of Tsanin's first magazine, Illustrierter Wochenblatt, in quantity for the benefit of newly arrived Yiddish-speaking soldiers. However, the army cancelled that subscription after only three months, a decision Tsanin interpreted as ideologically motivated.

Friction between Tsanin and the establishment came to a head in 1964. Lezte Neies was by then, as mentioned above, owned by a subsidiary of Mapai (the governing party at the time and long a leading force in the battle against Yiddish). Though Tsanin, still editor-in-chief, had much to complain about on the language-war front (for example the government's policy of discouraging Yiddish theater) he consciously toned down his criticism in the interests of keeping his job. Nonetheless, a group of party functionaries felt that Tsanin's fulsome praise of Yiddish and the Eastern European Jewish culture that went with it went too far at suggesting an invidious comparison to the heritage of Jews from North Africa and the Middle East, and for that tried to get Tsanin fired. They found some support from the prime minister, David Ben-Gurion, who said about Tsanin, "I don't read that Lezte Neies paper, but I know its editor was once an anti-Zionist and I have no idea how he wound up in Israel." Ben Gurion's accusation was not implausible in view of Tsanin's own statement (see above) about "treif" Zionist newspapers. Nonetheless, Tsanin kept his job.

In time, the government became more tolerant of Yiddish. Tsanin's one-time protege Yitzhak Luden summed it up: "Tsanin symbolized Yiddish in the Jewish state, and the authorities' attitude to him was always an indication of its attitude to the Yiddish language."
