= Sounds Eclectic =

Weekly radio program hosted by Nic Harcourt

Sounds Eclectic, was a weekly syndicated public radio program hosted by Nic Harcourt that plays a variety of music, often by emerging artists. A trademark of the program is recordings of live sessions from artists both established and new, taken from the archives of the daily KCRW program Morning Becomes Eclectic. A number of well known bands, such as Coldplay, Norah Jones, Dido, Jem, Sigur Rós and David Gray were featured on the show before they achieved widespread fame.

Sounds Eclectic is produced at KCRW in Santa Monica, California and was distributed by Public Radio International until February, 2009. KCRW also produces two other shows: Morning Becomes Eclectic, broadcast every morning from 9 am to noon, and Weekend Becomes Eclectic, aired on weekends. The programs were created by Tom Schnabel, who hosted them for many years. Chris Douridas was also a host.
