= The Better Angels Society =

501(c)(3) organization

- The Better Angels Society
- Formation: 2011
- Type: 501(c)(3), charitable organization
- Tax ID no.: 45-4587107
- Website: www.thebetterangelssociety.org

The Better Angels Society is a 501(c)(3) organization with a stated mission of supporting outstanding American history documentaries to inspire lifelong learning, promote civic engagement, and encourage civil discourse. The Better Angel Society assists filmmakers by providing funds to mentor, complete, broadcast, promote, and share their documentaries through educational and civic outreach programs.

Katherine Malone-France was appointed President & CEO in 2023, taking the reins from Amy Margerum Berg who served as the organization's president between 2016-2023.

According to their website, they support:

- American history documentaries from directors like Ken Burns and Florentine Films; Lynn Novick and Skiff Mountain Films
- American history documentaries through the annual Library of Congress Lavine/Ken Burns Prize for Film and the Better Angels Lavine Fellowship
- Young filmmakers, ages 11-22, building the next generation of American history documentarians by providing students and young filmmakers with the tools and opportunities to tell the stories of our shared history through The Next Generation Angels Awards and the Latest Generation Film Contest."

== The Library of Congress Lavine/Ken Burns Prize for Film ==
In 2019, a partnership between The Better Angels Society, the Library of Congress, and the Crimson Lion/Lavine Family Foundation announced the creation of the Library of Congress Lavine/Ken Burns Prize for Film. "The prize provides critical recognition and resources to filmmakers who produce exemplary documentary films that tell compelling stories about American history." The grant is funded by Jeannie Lavine and her husband Jonathan Lavine, co-managing partner of Bain Capital through a $15 million gift to The Better Angels Society.

The winner receives a $200,000 cash prize. All films that meet the criteria are reviewed by The Better Angels Society and passed to a robust group of peer reviewers, which includes past Prize for Film awardees as well as historians and archivists. The top-ranked films then move to a National Jury, which selects the top six finalists before the winner and runner-up are selected by the Library of Congress in consultation with Burns.

The first winner of the prize was Flannery, a film on Southern Gothic writer Flannery O’Connor by filmmakers Elizabeth Coffman and Mark Bosco. Flannery was broadcast on American Masters in 2021. Flannery's life later inspired a Hollywood adaptation directed by Ethan Hawke. The runner-up was Mae West: Dirty Blonde, a film on actress Mae West that premiered as part of PBS American Masters on June 16, 2020. Since then, winners, runners-up, and finalists have received widespread acclaim and recognition.

Library of Congress Lavine/Ken Burns Prize for Film Awards
Year	Winner	Runner-up	Finalists	
2019	Flannery	Mae West: Dirty Blonde	Mr. Soul!	The Adventures of Saul Bellow
2019	Flannery	Mae West: Dirty Blonde	The First Angry Man	9to5: The Story of a Movement
2020	Hold Your Fire	Cured	After Antarctica	Beethoven in Beijing
2020	Hold Your Fire	Cured	Punch 9 for Harold Washington	Storming Caesar's Palace
2021	Gradually, Then Suddenly: The Bankruptcy of Detroit	Free Chol Soo Lee	Double Exposure (working title)	Exposing Muybridge
2021	Gradually, Then Suddenly: The Bankruptcy of Detroit	Free Chol Soo Lee	The Five Demands	Bonnie Blue: James Cotton's Life in the Blues
2022	Bella! Philly on Fire		Virgil Thomson: Creating The American Sound	Imagining the Indian: The Fight Against Native American
2022	Bella! Philly on Fire		Raymond Lewis: L.A. Legend	Cannabis Buyers Club
2023	Drop Dead City: New York on the Brink in 1975	The Disappearance of Miss Scott	The Harvest: Integrating Mississippi's Schools	The Incomparable Mr. Buckley
2023	Drop Dead City: New York on the Brink in 1975	The Disappearance of Miss Scott	Max Roach: The Drum Also Waltzes	Modernism Inc: The Eliot Noyes Design Story
2024	Cartoon Kings	Magic & Monsters	Area 2	Behind the Lines
2024	Cartoon Kings	Magic & Monsters	Dory Previn: On My Way to Where	Wednesdays in Mississippi
2025	American Pachuco: The Legend of Luis Valdez	Diamond Diplomacy	The Inquisitor	One More Mission
2025	American Pachuco: The Legend of Luis Valdez	Diamond Diplomacy	Soul Patrol	The White House Effect
2026	Once Upon a Time in Harlem	Romare Bearden: A Life in Collage	The Animated Mind of Oliver Sacks	Barrio Television
2026	Once Upon a Time in Harlem	Romare Bearden: A Life in Collage	The Day Freedom Died	Zenón and the Rebel Boats

== Better Angels Lavine Fellowship ==
Established in 2021, The Better Angels Lavine Fellowship is made possible by The Better Angels Society and a generous gift from philanthropists Jeannie and Jonathan Lavine. Each year, five compelling documentaries are selected that represent the full range of U.S. history and are well-positioned to benefit from customized mentorship. Working with The Better Angels Society, the Fellows select the type of mentorship, guidance, and advice they need to advance their project and seek distribution. In the past, the Fellowship has focused on marketing and distribution, archival materials, and the PBS programming process. Each fellow receives a cash prize of $5,000. This is the companion program to the Library of Congress Lavine/Ken Burns Prize for Film.

== Amy Margerum Berg Education Fund ==
Amy Margerum Berg served as president of The Better Angels Society from 2016-2023. To honor Amy, the Board of Directors of The Better Angels Society appointed her President Emerita and created the Amy Margerum Berg Education Fund. With $1 million already raised, the Fund will support the expansion of The Better Angels Society's programs and partnerships to engage students with our shared history and the process of making documentary films to tell the stories of our past that are meaningful to them. As they do so, they will gain valuable research, communications, and civics skills.

== Support for Young Filmmakers ==
The Better Angels Society currently offers two partnership programs that invite 11- to 22-year-olds to participate in free training on filmmaking, participate in film competitions, and receive additional mentorship for winning films: The Latest Generation Film Contest, in partnership with the Lincoln Presidential Foundation (14 to 22 years old), and the Next Generation Angels Awards, in partnership with National History Day (11 to 18 years old).

Both programs encourage young filmmakers to create historical documentaries as an educational experience that enhances historical knowledge, research and communication skills, confidence, critical thinking, and civic engagement.

== Trademark dispute ==
In 2019, the United States District Court for the Southern District of New York ruled in favor of The Better Angels Society on its trademark infringement claims against New York-based nonprofit Institute for American Values, which launched its own Better Angels initiative after the 2016 presidential election as a grassroots effort to “reunify Red and Blue America.” The organization is now called Braver Angels. The case was noted for demonstrating that the need to defend trademark rights extends to charitable nonprofits, so that donors know which organization they are supporting.

== Films supported ==
Films which have been supported by the society include but are not limited to:

- Prohibition (2011)
- The Dust Bowl (2012)
- The Central Park Five (2012)
- The Address (2014)
- The Roosevelts: An Intimate History (2014)
- Jackie Robinson (2016)
- Defying the Nazis: The Sharps' War (2016)
- The Vietnam War (2017)
- The Mayo Clinic: Faith - Hope - Science (2018)
- College Behind Bars (2019)
- Country Music (2019)
- 9to5: The Story of a Movement (2020)
- Becoming Helen Keller (2021)
- Flannery (2021)
- Bella! (2022)
- Flood in the Desert (2022)
- Joe Papp in Five Acts (2022)
- Marian Anderson: The Whole World in Her Hands (2022)
- Plague at the Golden Gate (2022)
- The U.S. and the Holocaust (2022)
- Taken Hostage (2022)
- The American Buffalo (2023)
- The Lie Detector (2023)
- Ruthless: Monopoly’s Secret History (2023)
- The Sun Queen (2023)
- Zora Neale Hurston: Claiming A Space(2023)
- The American Revolution (2025)
- Crime and Punishment in America (2026)
- Inside the Oval: Decisions of Consequence (2028)
