= Gerard F. Doherty =

American political figure (1928–2020)

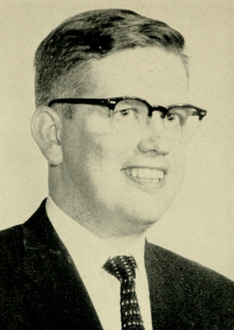

Chair of the Massachusetts Democratic Party
- In office 1962–1967
- Preceded by: John M. Lynch
- Succeeded by: Lester Hyman

Member of the Massachusetts House of Representatives
- In office 1957–1965

Personal details
- Born: Gerard Francis Doherty; April 6, 1928 Boston, Massachusetts, U.S.
- Died: June 16, 2020 (aged 92) Boston, Massachusetts, U.S.
- Party: Democratic
- Spouse(s): Marilyn Dillon (m. 1955; died 2016) Regina L. Quinlan
- Education: Harvard College; Wayne State University; Suffolk University Law School
- Profession: Politician, lawyer

Gerard Francis Doherty (April 6, 1928 – June 16, 2020) was an American political figure who was a member of the Massachusetts House of Representatives from 1957 to 1965 and Chairman of the Massachusetts Democratic Party from 1962 to 1967.

== Early life ==
Doherty was born on April 6, 1928, in Charlestown. He graduated from Malden Catholic High School, where he was an All-Catholic guard on the football team. He played on the Harvard freshman football team, but his football career was ended by a bout of tuberculosis which required a two-year stay at the Adirondack Cottage Sanitarium. He graduated from Harvard College in 1952. After working on John F. Kennedy's 1952 United States Senate campaign, Doherty resumed his education at Wayne State University, where he earned a master's degree in public health administration.

== Political career ==
After an unsuccessful campaign in 1954, Doherty was elected to the Massachusetts House of Representatives in 1956, representing the 2nd Suffolk District. In 1962, Doherty gained statewide attention as a campaign manager for Ted Kennedy's Senate campaign.

On December 12, 1962, with the backing of Senator-elect Ted Kennedy and governor Endicott Peabody, Doherty was unanimously elected Chairman of the Massachusetts Democratic Party. Soon after taking office, Doherty announced that he would coordinate patronage statewide patronage, a move that upset Peabody and his supporters as it was seen as a power-grab by Kennedy. In 1963, Doherty backed Michael Paul Feeney's unsuccessful challenge to House speaker John F. Thompson. Doherty backed incumbent Endicott Peabody in the 1964 Massachusetts gubernatorial election. Peabody was defeated by primary challenger Francis Bellotti. Bellotti went on to lose the general election to Republican John Volpe. In the 1966 Massachusetts gubernatorial election, Doherty backed Senate President Maurice A. Donahue. Donahue lost the convention vote to Edward J. McCormack, Jr. and chose endorse McCormack rather than run in the primary. In the 1966 Massachusetts general election, the Democrats were unable to win any of the four statewide offices not held by an incumbent. On January 5, 1967, Doherty resigned as party chairman. He was succeeded by Lester Hyman.

=== Presidential campaigns ===
In 1964, Doherty, on the recommendation of Ted Kennedy, was chosen by President Lyndon B. Johnson to run his campaign in Massachusetts. In 1968, Doherty ran Robert F. Kennedy's presidential campaign in Indiana. In 1976, he was campaign director for Jimmy Carter's presidential campaign in New York.

== Personal life and death ==
In 1955, Doherty married Marilyn Dillon, an elementary school teacher's aide. She died in 2016. Doherty later married retired state Superior Court justice Regina L. Quinlan.

In 1961, Doherty graduated from Suffolk University Law School and after being admitted to the bar, began practicing real estate, public policy, and energy law.

After stepping down as party chairman, Doherty became a leading Boston lobbyist and served on the state Board of Regents of Higher Education.

Doherty died on June 16, 2020, at his home in Charlestown. He was 92 years old. He was buried in Holy Cross Cemetery in Malden, Massachusetts.

Party political offices
Preceded by John M. Lynch	Chairman of the Massachusetts Democratic Party; 1962–1967	Succeeded by Lester Hyman
