= Music Lust =

Music Lust: Recommended Listening for Every Mood, Moment, and Reason is a book written by Nic Harcourt, the music director for the Santa Monica, California, radio station KCRW.

The book, featuring selections gathered from Harcourt's extensive personal musical knowledge, comprises numerous essays on various genres and movements, and Harcourt includes several esoteric and original categories, as well.

Music Lust takes its basic premise from Book Lust, which was written by librarian Nancy Pearl and includes literary selections and recommendations.

Music Lust was published in 2005 by Sasquatch Books with ISBN 1-57061-437-7.
