= Lane Windham =

American historian

Lane Windham is a historian and the associate director of Kalmanovitz Initiative for Labor and the Working Poor and co-director of WILL Empower (Women Innovating Labor Leadership) at Georgetown University.

== Education and career ==
Windham holds a bachelor's degree from Duke University, as well as a Master of Arts and PhD from the University of Maryland, where she completed a dissertation supervised by historian Julie Greene. Before enrolling in graduate school at the University of Maryland, Windham was employed in the media outreach department of the national AFL-CIO. Windham attended the AFL-CIO Organizing Institute after college before working as a union organizer for the Amalgamated Clothing and Textile Workers Union, and later the Union of Needletrades, Industrial and Textile Employees in the American South. Windham is also a co-director of Women Innovating Labor Leadership Empower.

== Scholarship ==
Windham is the author of Knocking on Labor's Door: Union Organizing in the 1970s and the Roots of a New Economic Divide. The book argues that the decline of labor union membership in the United States is a primary cause of rising socioeconomic inequality, and that declining labor union membership is traceable to a shift among employers toward strategies to combat labor unions during the 1970s. Windham documents several union organizing efforts in the United States, including the 9to5 movement. Historian Michael Honey reviewed the book favorably, arguing that the book "helps us better understand how the challenge of working-class organizing was beaten back and beaten down by a coordinated assault from business."

== Awards ==
Windham is the 2018 recipient of the Organization of American Historians David Montgomery Award for her book Knocking on Labor's Door.

== Personal life ==
Windham, now divorced, was married to Joe Uehlein, director of the Labor Network for Sustainability.

== Bibliography ==
=== Sole authored books ===
- Windham, Lane (2017). Knocking on Labor's Door: Union Organizing in the 1970s and the Roots of a New Economic Divide. Chapel Hill, NC: University of North Carolina Press. ISBN 978-1-4696-5477-5.
