= A.R.E. Weapons (album) =

Studio album by A.R.E. Weapons
- Released: April 1, 2003
- Genre: Electroclash
- Length: 36:18
- Label: Rough Trade
- Producer: Marc Waterman

A.R.E. Weapons chronology
A.R.E. Weapons (2003)	Free in the Streets (2005)

A.R.E. Weapons is the debut album by the band of the same name, released on April 1, 2003, on Rough Trade Records. The Sydney Morning Herald wrote that the album "makes like some call out to angry youth, tapping into a spirit of eager rebellion that seems timeless."

Professional ratings
Aggregate scores
Source	Rating
Metacritic	(64%)
Review scores
Source	Rating
Allmusic	2.5/5 stars
City Pages	(slightly favorable)
Pitchfork Media	1.5/10
Robert Christgau	(1-star Honorable Mention)
Spin	B

== Track listing ==
1. "Don't Be Scared"
2. "Strange Dust"
3. "Changes"
4. "A.R.E."
5. "Fuck You Pay Me"
6. "Headbanger Face"
7. "Bad News"
8. "Black Mercedes"
9. "Street Gang"
10. "Hey World"
