= Lebns Fragn =

Lebns Fragn (Life questions, Yiddish: לעבנס־פֿראַגן) was a Yiddish, Bundist-orientated magazine, published bimonthly in Israel. The first issue appeared in May 1951, under the editorship of Isachar Artuski. The responsibility for editing was shared by Ben-Zion ("Bentsl") Tsalevitsh (1883–1967). Tsalevitsh had come to Palestine in 1922, after having been active for many years in the Bund in Białystok, and Artuski, a member of the Warsaw Bund since 1935, arrived in Palestine during the Second World War.

After Artuski's death in November 1971, Yitzkhok Luden became editor. The last issue was published in April, 2014.
