= 9to5 =

American nonprofit organization

9to5, National Association of Working Women is an organization established in 1973 that is dedicated to improving working conditions and ensuring the rights of women and families in the United States. The organization strove to close both the wage and opportunity gaps between men and women and sought to mend workplace relationships between males and females, fostering an environment focused on coexistence rather than one dominated by men. The 9to5 movement worked both locally and nationally during its prime years, and later the struggles and stories of those involved were made into a documentary that raised even more awareness nationwide. The 9to5 movement could be considered as a part of the feminist movement; however, many women preferred not being called feminists since women of color have already fought against racial disparities for centuries. The 9to5 movement also helped Black women in Cleveland, Ohio to gain nationwide awareness about racial disparities in various factories.

== History ==
The roots of the 9to5 movement can be traced to the lived experiences and activism of its eventual founders, Karen Nussbaum and Ellen Cassedy. Before forming 9to5, Nussbaum and Cassedy were not focused on creating a labor organization. Instead, they were involved in broader social struggles, including women's rights activism and antiwar movements. While working on these causes, they ran low on money and took jobs as secretaries, where they observed firsthand the mistreatment and inequities faced by women in office work. These experiences inspired them to develop the concept of a labor organization specifically for women office workers, leading to the formation of the Women Office Workers at Harvard, which later became the foundation for the 9to5 movement.

Even before 9to5 began to take shape, several laws had already been passed to address sex-based discrimination in the workplace, including the Equal Pay Act of 1963 and Title VII of the Civil Rights Act of 1964. The Equal Pay Act aimed to abolish wage disparities between men and women performing the same work. Meanwhile, Title VII established the Equal Employment Opportunity Commission (EEOC), which enforces laws prohibiting workplace discrimination based on sex or sexual orientation. Additionally, it allowed women to file complaints and pursue legal action against their employers if they believed they were being discriminated against. Despite these advances, women in the workplace continued to feel underrepresented and underappreciated.

The first concrete step toward building the movement came in December 1972 with the publication of 9to5: Newsletter for Boston Area Office Workers. The goal of the newsletter was to reach all clerical workers, not just women. About a year later, the newsletter's publishers announced the formation of Boston 9to5, a grassroots collective for women office workers that addressed issues such as low pay, limited advancement opportunities, workplace sexual harassment, and the lack of professional respect.

Women who joined the 9to5 movement started as women who were first hand witnesses of the misogyny and mistreatment of women in the workplace. Secretaries like Fran Cicchetti, a Boston insurance secretary, were made false promises by their bosses leading them to expect training for new tasks in their jobs and possible promotions. When Cicchetti asked her boss about the promise he had made, her boss promoted a male to the new title. This brought new ideas that women should not get treated like this in the workplace and Cicchetti became an activist. As one of the earliest 9to5 activists, she helped join forces with other women fighting the same issues and created the "organization for women office workers." Eventually this turned into the 9to5 movement where Fran became the head of the finance committee and lobbied with the insurance commissioner to create new standards on job postings and promotions.

The national organization has buildings in Milwaukee, Wisconsin, and Atlanta, Georgia, as well as appearing in states including Colorado and California. The organization had as many as 12,000 members.

The terms "office wife" and "office maid" were also very common within the work place. Both of these terms made women feel disrespected and blurred the line between professional and inappropriate relationships of boss and secretary.

=== Hearing on Working Conditions of Women Office Workers ===
Members of 9to5 would hold meetings to discuss their goals as an organization and movement. One goal they discussed was the creation of a Bill of Rights for Women Office Workers. African American women wanted this bill to prioritize providing childcare during the workday; however, founders chose to exclude this provision from their list of conditions because they believed it would jeopardize the bill passing. In April 1974, hundreds of women attended the "Hearing on the Working Conditions of Women Office Workers" in Boston, where the group testified. As a result, the bill was signed and secured important rights such as written job descriptions, salary reviews, workplace respect, and equal benefits regardless of gender. This win helped lay the groundwork for further campaigns demanding equal pay.

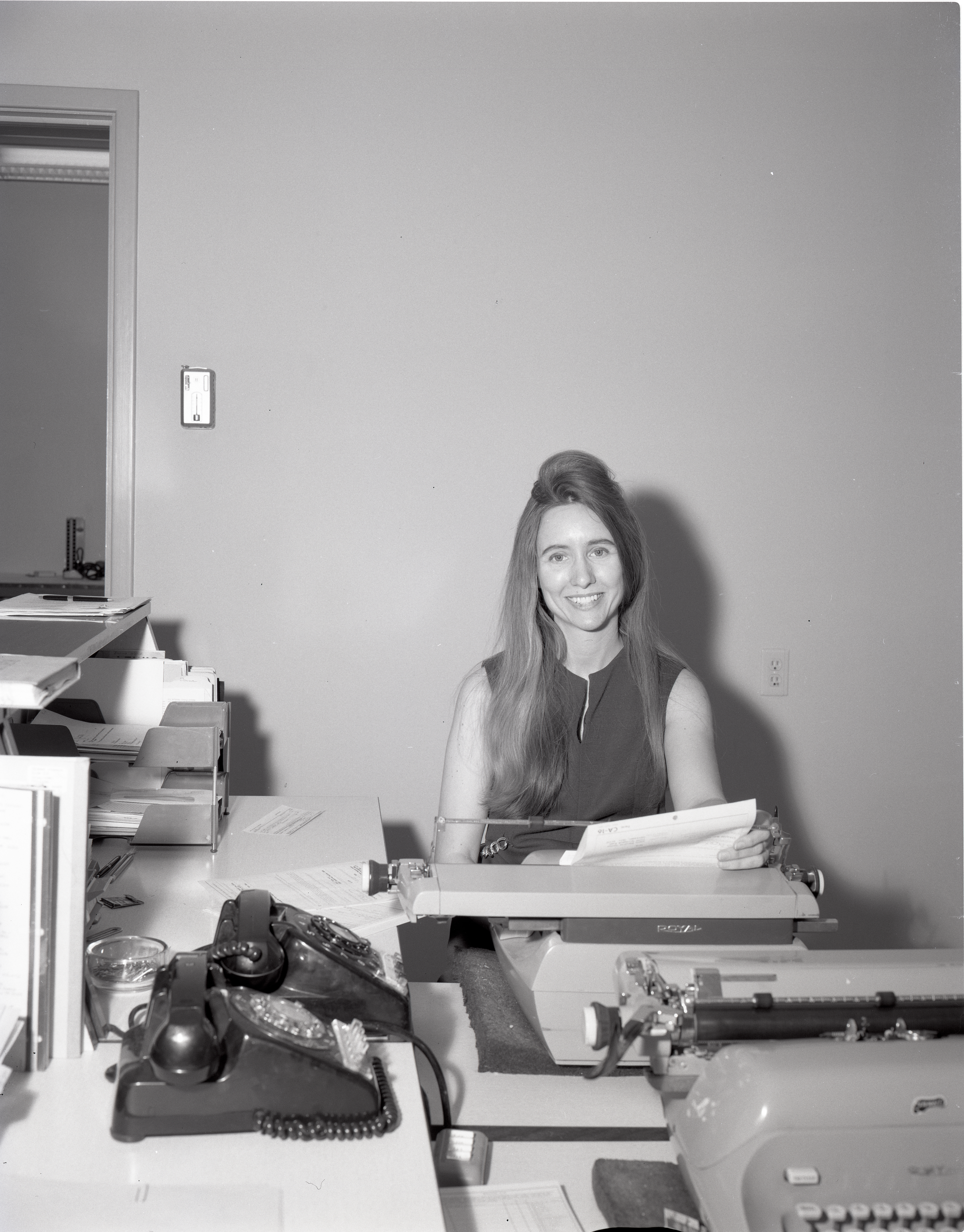
Female office worker during National Secretaries Week in the mid-1970s. National Secretaries Day was observed as part of the broader National Secretaries Week.

One of the organization's earliest victories included a class-action lawsuit against several Boston publishing companies that resulted in $1.5 million back pay for the female plaintiffs. In 1975, 9to5's founders partnered with the Service Employees International Union (SEIU) to form Local 925 in Boston, providing office workers access to collective bargaining rights.

=== National Secretaries Day ===
The 9to5 movement was instrumental in addressing the grievances of women and their relationships with their male counterparts in the workplace. National Secretaries Day was a topic brought up in their movement because it was a day for male bosses to take their female secretaries out for the day. The women would be given roses by their bosses as well as a meal. The male interpretation of this day was that bosses were adequately recognizing their secretaries. On the contrary, female secretaries felt as though they were treated adequately for one day, but the rest of their working hours consisted of unfair and inappropriate boss and secretary relationships. The members of 9to5 eventually coined phrases such as "raises not roses" in order to combat National Secretaries Day and create a call to action.

== Development and influence ==
In 1977, 9to5 Boston merged with Cleveland Women Working (est. 1975 primarily by Helen Williams) to create the Cleveland-based Working Women Organizing Project. Based in Cleveland from 1977 to 1993, the national organization was a coalition of like-minded associations and was headed by Karen Nussbaum, one of Boston 9to5's founders. Nussbaum was the executive director of 9to5 while also being the president of Local 925 until 1993. Nussbaum's involvement in the organization began with her friend Ellen Cassedy, whom she met at Harvard University, while they were working as secretaries. Together, they founded the Boston 9to5 after several years of recruitment and the formation of smaller like-minded groups.

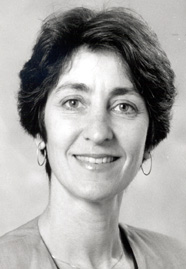
Karen Nussbaum, founder of the 9to5 Movement

Cassedy held the role of recruiting, organizing, and contacting potential members, as well as handling relations with bosses and CEOs of other organizations. She trained at the Midwest Academy serving as a scout to learn the basics of union organization. While working for 9to5, Cassedy advocated that "9to5 attempted to challenge 'what was in the culture – that office work wasn't really work, office workers were not true workers, [and] women's work was not that important.'"

Debbie Schneider worked for the women's organization of office workers in New York City and eventually joined 9to5 in Cincinnati, Ohio. Before either of those placements, though, she was originally denied access to the group right off the bat. She kept trying, went to the recruitment lunches, and eventually gained her status in the movement. While a part of the organization, she was in charge of organizing university clericals.

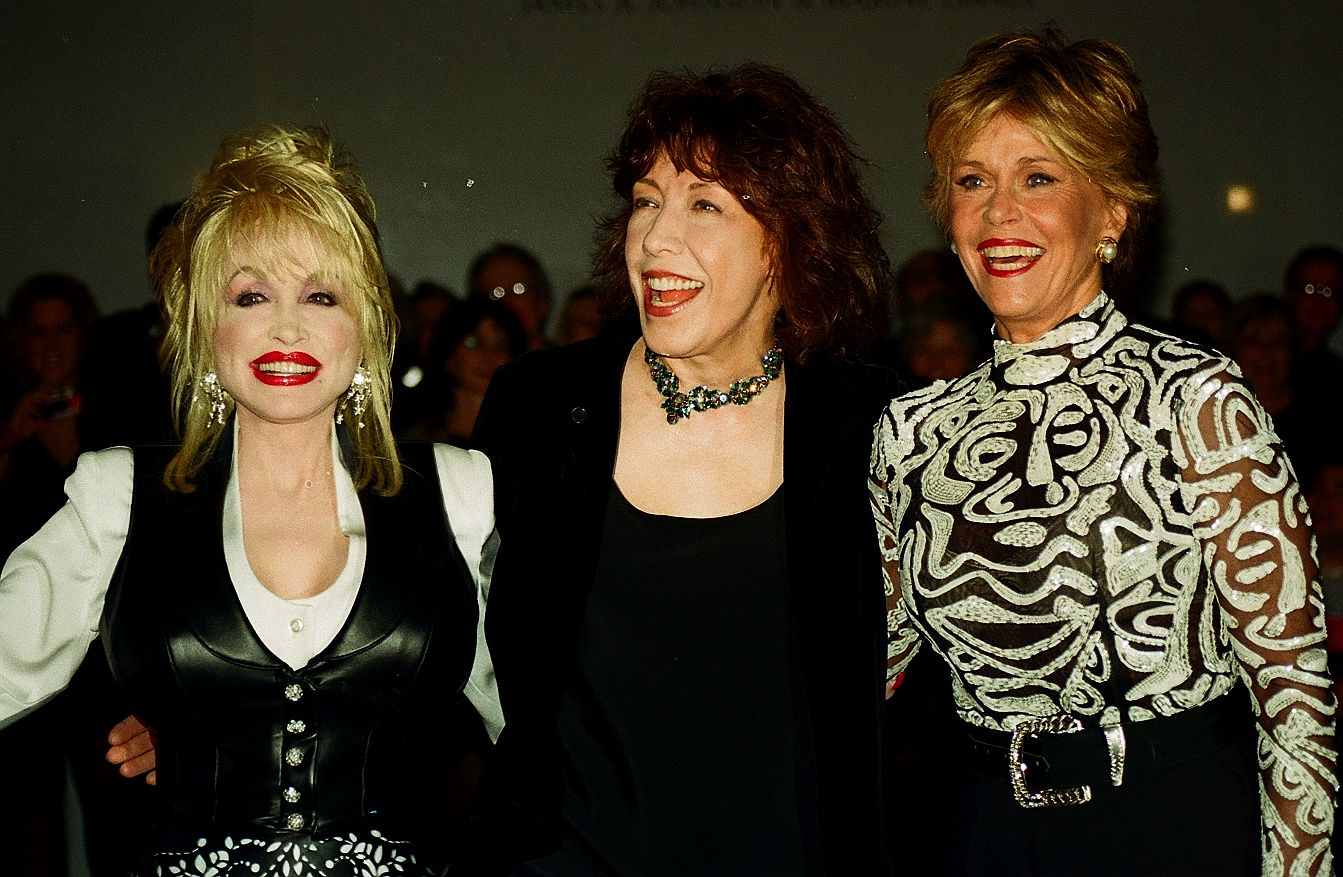
Dolly Parton, Lily Tomlin, and Jane Fonda

The group was later known as the National Association of Working Women. Members of this group met with Jane Fonda and served as an inspiration for the smash-hit comedy, 9 to 5, featuring Fonda, Dolly Parton, and Dabney Coleman, among others. The film focuses on clerical working women, their experiences at work, and the overall activism of the 9 to 5 women during the 1970s, and the unionizing of the 1980s.

Julia Reichert and Steven Bognar filmed a documentary about the 9to5 movement that was released in 2021.

=== Tactics ===
The members of the 9to5 Movement often used unorthodox tactics to carry out their efforts. Along with lawsuits and petitions, public relations efforts were some of the most influential aspects of the entire movement. There were demands for an office "Bill of Rights" when attention was heavily focused on the National Secretaries Day debate. Additionally, members of the 9to5 Movement also conducted "worst boss contests." The contests told stories of secretaries who were mistreated by their bosses in an unprofessional manner. Karen Nussbaum used these "worst boss contests" to spread stories of secretaries who were fired due to boss outbursts rather than work ethic complications.

9to5 also held workshops on issues such as sexual harassment, workplace safety, and pay equity, aiming to reach more office workers, educate them about their rights, and legitimize organizing as a means of workplace improvement. Equally central to 9to5’s strategy was leadership development. Clerical workers were trained to represent the organization publicly and guide its activities, which ensured that the movement was led by those it served. Additionally, the group often paired Black and white members for public appearances to highlight its commitment to racial inclusion. Together, these strategies aimed to broaden participation among women office workers and strengthen their ability to advocate for improved working conditions.

=== Local 925 ===
The 9to5 Movement eventually joined its sister movement called Local 925. Local 925 was established in Boston in 1975, in order to create a way for women to obtain insurance and banking. Local 925 would mostly include clerical workers since they were targeted by District 65. Together, they worked to eliminate discriminatory pay and promote unionization.

=== Sexual harassment ===
Sexual harassment was first coined by a radical feminist activist Lin Farley after she encountered and learned about the Carmita Woods case. Woods was a female administrative assistant at Cornell's Laboratory of Nuclear Studies where she was constantly sexually harassed by her superior. One example included her supervisor putting his hands on Woods's bottom at an office party. With this, Farley was able to come to a conclusion that sexual harassment was present within her workplace.

The 9to5 movement also focused on sexual harassment within a workplace. Women were usually the ones experiencing sexual harassment during their work experience. Sex was seen as a sense of power over another woman. Sexual harassment was divided into two categories: hostile work environment and quid pro quo. A hostile work environment is when an employee is harassed by either a co-worker, a non-worker, or a boss over a period of time while Quid pro quo is when a supervisor demands sexual pleasure after an employee in exchange for a better job position/benefits.

In the early history of America, women only had legal and social power through their family and if married through their husbands, meaning that as individuals they had no legal say in their social relationship to others. Both parties (Republicans and Democrats) voted and included the amendment to prohibit sex discrimination in the workplace in the Title VII of the Civil Rights Act during the Civil Rights Movement in 1964. In 1978, the first marital rape case was presented in court, the Oregon v. Rideout trial. Before then, marital rape was not considered a legal case because the previous legal understanding was that after marriage, the woman had forfeited herself to her husband that she was not able to take it back.

The 9to5 movement realized that sexual harassment revolved around the unlimited power posed by satisfaction. Ellan Bravo, one of the authors of The 9to5 Guide to Combating Sexual Harassment, led a sexual harassment experiment with different corporations. One of the exercises she employed was doing role reversal, the men would play the role of female workers and Bravo would play the role of the male boss. Through this exercise, Bravo would show that the men knew they were making their female coworkers uncomfortable and were simply exercising their power.

== 9to5 Documentary ==
The active years of the 9to5 organization have come and gone. However, in 2021, a documentary was released that told the story of the women within the 9to5 movement, their struggles, how they gained support, and their tactics in victory. The women at the heart of the movement, like Karen Nussbaum and Ellen Cassedy, were interviewed and asked about how the 9to5 movement changed the outlook of their careers, and looked into what they're doing in life now. The documentary, directed by Julia Reichert and Steven Bognar, highlights the power of music in change, and includes Dolly Parton's "9 to 5" song, which is directly related to the movement itself. It tells the story of the 9to5 movement, and how the original idea of a feminist movement quickly became one of an independent labor union with goals to reach and bosses to dethrone. Including interviews of the many faces involved in the movement, the documentary is a visual representation of the many thoughts, voices, and hearts behind the labor movement. Since its premiere, the documentary has helped highlight the pain of being involved in a women's movement, but also the glory of it, and has won "Best Women's Film" at the Key West Film Festival.

== Feminism and Racial Barriers Within 9to5 ==
In the beginning, the 9to5 movement was composed primarily of middle-class women who were fighting more for liberal workplace rights than explicitly feminist rights. The group was also skeptical of joining male-dominated labor unions, as most union leadership positions were held by men who did not recognize the value of the issues 9to5 sought to address.

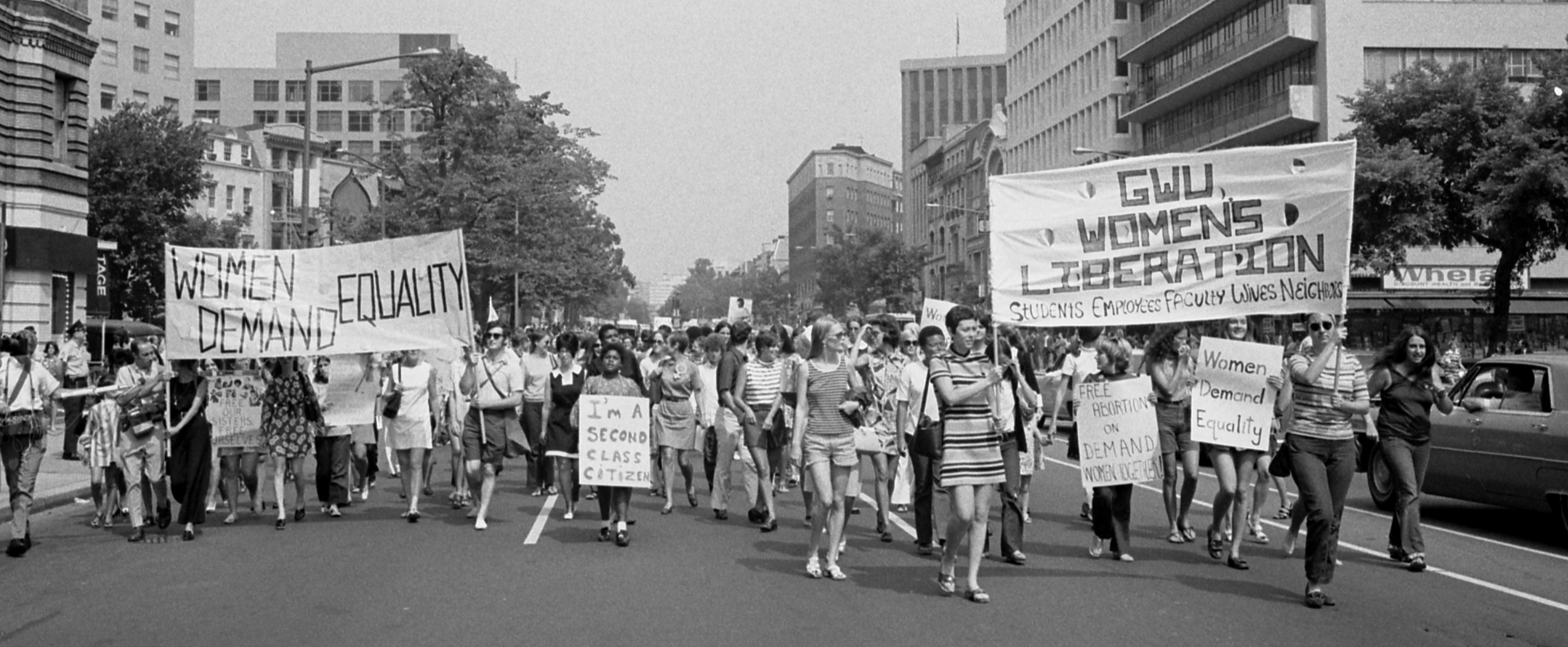
Women's Liberation in Washington (1970s)

Feminism in the 20th Century looked a little bit different compared to feminism in the 21st Century. Second wave feminism started to grow in the 1970s, where socialism, gender equality, and the nuclear family importance came in play. Women during 1970s wanted to be a part of the women's movement while joining 9to5, but they opposed to have a label of being "a feminist." Some women wanted to have equal job opportunities, but they did not consider themselves as feminists since they did not agree with all the values feminism stands for (even though America was in the middle of the second-wave feminist movement). Some Black women also did not consider themselves as feminists; their claim is that they have been fighting for equal rights their entire life and so they did not see a reason why they should accept a new label. On the other hand, 9to5 organizers did consider themselves as feminists since they were fighting not only for equal jobs for white women, but for single mothers, black women, or disabled people. However, women were still talking loudly for their rights even without a feminist label.

Although 9to5 addressed racial injustice and the poor working class, the organization was initially focused on gender equality. As the movement gained momentum around the United States, local chapters started to pair black and white organizers to strengthen leadership and perspective. In the 1980s, 9to5 uncovered that the majority of black women in Cleveland, Ohio were working low-paid, office jobs. This discovery prompted the organization to build racially diverse chapters, helping black women overcome white dominance in the workplace. These efforts helped 9to5 gain nationwide attention.

== Continued Efforts ==
In 1981, the National Association of Working Women formed a national-level partnership with SEIU and formed SEIU District 925, a nationwide labor union for office workers. After several name changes, the organization adopted its current name in 1983, and "9to5, National Association of Working Women" evolved into the largest membership organization of working women in the United States. During the 1980s and 1990s, 9to5 focused on issues such as the effects of automation, pay inequities, medical leave, and racial and sexual harassment and discrimination.

The organization effectively used the media and lobbied legislators as part of a campaign to warn the public of the health dangers of video display terminals (also known as VDTs). Additionally, they have also used the media to draw attention to several sexual harassment cases in the 1990s.

In 1987, 9to5 had a large influence on the Job Retention Project, a project that helped office workers develop workplace skills. This organization also provided educational resources that addressed employees' struggles, such as Ellen Bravo's The Job/Family Challenge: A 9to5 Guide (1995).

Among other issues, 9to5 actively promotes workplace policies such as paid sick leave, equal pay, and an end to discrimination for hiring or firing based on gender or sexual orientation. 9to5 additionally staffs a Job Survival Helpline to give support to women facing difficulties or challenges in the workplace. Pay roll equality between men and women was not finalized by the end of the 20th Century. However, the 9to5 movement has challenged and partially changed working conditions for women and men. Sexual harassment has decreased and work equality increased in the work places all over the United States.

Going into the 21st century, 9to5 expanded its focus to broader work and family policy reforms. By the early 2000s, the organization started campaigning more for paid sick days, paid family and medical leave, paid maternal leave, and affordable childcare for working mothers. In 2004, 9to5 raised awareness to the lack of paid leave for mothers. Then, in 2016, the organization commissioned polling for paid-leave legislation that was widely supported by the public. These efforts established 9to5 as a leading advocate for state and federal laws supporting working family. Throughout the 2010s, 9to5 continued to advocate for equal labor standards. The group worked with public education campaigns and local ordinance campaigns to pass paid sick leave. They also hosted Equal Pay Day events, and encouraged voters to support pro-worker policies. By this time, 9to5 had grown from a local office workers' group into a national organization fighting for economic justice for working women.

== See also ==
- Women's rights
