= Yitzhak Luden =

Israeli Yiddish journalist and writer (1922 - 2017)

Yitzhak Luden, (Hebrew: יצחק לודן; also Yitzkhok Luden, Yitzkhok Luden; 1922– November 2017) was an Israeli Yiddish journalist and writer, and a Bundist, described as " the last of the surviving activists in the Israeli branch of the Bundists".

== Biography ==
Yitzhak Luden was born in Warsaw to a family of a self-employed painter with five children, having two brothers and two sisters. At the age of 15 he fled to the Soviet Union, where he spent two years in Soviet detention: in a prison and in a Gulag labor camp. He returned to Poland in 1946 and found that his all family but his brother Yosef perished in The Holocaust. In 1948 he emigrated from Poland and eventually came to Israel. Since early 1950s until 1991 he was a journalist for the Yiddish newspaper Latze Neyez (Latest News). Meanwhile, he joined a branch of Israeli Bund and in 1971 he became the editor-in-chief of their newspaper, Lebns Fragn, until its closure in 2014.

== Awards ==
- 1991: Itzik Manger Prize for Yiddish literature
- 2010: Mendele Mocher Sforim Prize for Yiddish Literature
- 2016: National Authority for Yiddish Culture Lifetime Achievement Award

== Family ==
Yitzhak Luden was survived by his wife and two daughters.
