= Allen Roskoff =

American gay rights activist

- Citizenship: United States
- Occupation: Political activist
- Years active: 1970–present
- Organization: Jim Owles Liberal Democratic Club
- Known for: LGBTQ+ activism
- Political party: Democrat
- Partner: Jim Owles

Allen Roskoff is an American political activist, who was the chief lobbyist for the nation's first gay rights bill, for which he is alternately credited as the author and co-author. The bill, which sought to prohibit discrimination based on sexual orientation, was introduced in 1971 and passed into law in New York City in 1986. A frequent commentator and columnist, Roskoff has contributed to publications such as The New York Native, Outweek, QW and the New York Blade.

In 2023, The New York Times reported that he has been "a gay rights activist who has worked with the city for over 50 years." His archives and manuscripts are held at the New York Public Library.

== Jim Owles Liberal Democratic Club ==
City and State New York called this club "The most powerful LGBTQ+ political club in the New York City." The club lists the Rev. Al Sharpton, Reps. Alexandria Ocasio-Cortez, state Comptroller Tom DiNapoli and other city and state elected officials among its members. As of 2024, Roskoff serves as the club's president.

== Political appointments ==
Roskoff was the first openly gay individual appointed to a New York City community board and the first to hold a position within the office of an elected official. He also served in the administrations of Comptroller Harrison J. Goldin, and Tom Duane.

== 2026 New York State Assembly Election & Opinion About Candidates ==
Roskoff commented in November 2025 that he was not satisfied with the quality of candidates vying to replace 30 plus year veteran State Assemblywoman Deborah Glick in the New York State Legislature. He said the Jim Owles Club will be searching vehemently for progressive or socialistic and possibly openly gay contenders to run for The New York State Assembly's 66th District.

== See also ==
- New York City Gay Rights Bill of 1986
- Gay Activists Alliance
- LGBTQ rights in New York
- LGBTQ history in New York
