= Ellen Bravo =

American activist and writer (born 1944)

Ellen Bravo is an American labor activist and writer known for her work advocating for improved labor standards and equality.

== Early life and education ==
Bravo was born in 1944, and grew up in Cleveland. Bravo attended Cornell University where she studied Greek and Latin, study she continued at Cambridge University. She then moved to Canada where she studied at McGill University.

== Career ==
Bravo taught for a period at St. Mary’s College and then moved into clerical work, which she saw as a way to support her time spent as a social activist.

In 1982, Bravo founded the Milwaukee chapter of 9to5. with Kitty Barber, Anne Devitt, and Jocelyn May. In Wisconsin, Bravo worked on numerous projects and created change in her local community. For instance, with the help of former Lieutenant Governor Barbara Lawton, she contributed and helped lead the Economic Sufficiency Task Force of the Wisconsin Women = Prosperity project.

By 1993, Bravo had become the national executive director of 9to5. As the executive director, Bravo highlighted sexual harassment in the workplace and shed light on the mistreatment of employers by their workers. Two years into her role as the executive director of 9to5, Bravo also acted as a representative for the United Nations’ Fourth World Conference on Women (in Beijing). Bravo also served on the Commission on Leave, which was arranged by Congress to help measure the impact of the Family and Medical Leave Act. She has spoken about issues facing people in the workspace to the House of Representatives (United States) and the United States Congress.

Her work expanded in 2004 when she became the executive director of Family Values @ Work, where her work includes tracking the promotions of women in male-dominated jobs.

== Honors and awards ==
Bravo received the Ford Foundation Visionary Award in 2011, the Francis Perkins Award for “Intelligence and Courage” in 2011, and the Legacy Award from the Ms. Foundation in 2014

== Selected publications ==
- Bravo, Ellen; Cassedy, Ellen (1992). The 9 to 5 Guide to Combating Sexual Harassment. Wiley. ISBN 978-0-471-57576-4.
- Bravo, Ellen (1995). The Job/Family Challenge. John Wiley & Sons. ISBN 978-0-471-04723-0.
- Bravo, Ellen (2007). Taking on the big boys, or, Why feminism is good for families, business, and the nation. New York: Feminist Press at the City University of New York. ISBN 978-1-55861-545-8. OCLC 70830976.
- Bravo, Ellen (2015). Again and again. Berkeley, CA: She Writes Press. ISBN 978-1-63152-939-9.
- Bravo, Ellen; Miller, Larry (2022). Standing up: Tales of Struggle. Hard Ball Press. ISBN 9781734493894.
