= Ellen Cassedy =

Workers' rights activist

- Born: 1950 (age 75–76); Brooklyn, New York, U.S.
- Education: Vermont College of Fine Arts
- Occupations: Labor activist; Translator; Writer
- Organization: 9to5

Ellen Cassedy (born 1950) is known for co-founding 9to5, an organization coordinating improved working conditions for office workers. Cassedy also translates into English from Yiddish.

== Early life and education ==
Cassedy was born in 1950 in Brooklyn to a Lithuanian-Jewish mother and Christian father. After her father died, Cassedy moved with her mother to the Washington, D.C. and Baltimore area. She has a brother and two sisters. The family moved to Long Island, where Cassedy went to high school.

== Yiddish translation ==
Although Cassedy's mother did not speak Yiddish fluently, Cassedy remembers some Yiddish words being used at home. Her grandfather, who lived in Brooklyn, as well as some extended family members, did speak Yiddish. After her mother died in 1989, Cassedy decided to learn Yiddish in order to honor her culture. She also decided to become an author, re-enrolling in school for an MFA in Creative Writing from Vermont College of Fine Arts.

In 2015, Cassedy was a translation fellow at the Yiddish Book Center, where she worked on translating a collection of short stories by Yenta Mash into English. She also completed a Yiddish summer program at Vilnius University. As a translator, Cassedy has translated children's books and short stories into English.

== 9to5 ==
Cassedy was working as an office worker at Harvard University when she met American labor leader Karen Nussbaum. After going to a weekend workshop for office workers, the two realized that many office workers faced challenges in the workplace. They formed the 9to5 organization in the Boston area with a group of eight other women, all located in Boston.

Cassedy wrote series of newspaper articles with Nussbaum that shared ideas from their book, 9 to 5: The Working Woman's Guide to Office Survival. They advocated for better working conditions for working secretaries. Cassedy was the editor of the 9 to 5 newsletter. She spoke against changes to affirmative action programs in 1975, and during the Reagan administration she worked on affirmative action programs.

Cassedy also wrote the one-woman play Beautiful Hills of Brooklyn that was inspired by diaries written by her great-aunt. The play was made into a film with Joanna Merlin playing the lead character, and won awards at multiple film festivals.

== Selected publications ==
- Cassedy, Ellen; Nussbaum, Bruce (1983-10-27). 9 to 5: Working Women. Harmondsworth, Middlesex, England: Penguin Books. ISBN 978-0-14-006751-4.
- Cassedy, Ellen (2022-09-06). Working 9 to 5: A Women's Movement, a Labor Union, and the Iconic Movie. Chicago Review Press.
- Bravo, Ellen; Cassedy, Ellen (1992-05-22). The 9 to 5 Guide to Combating Sexual Harassment: Candid Advice from 9 to 5, The National Association of Working Women (1st ed.). New York: Wiley. ISBN 978-0-471-57576-4.
- Cassedy, Ellen (2012-03-01). We Are Here: Memories of the Lithuanian Holocaust. Lincoln London: University of Nebraska Press. ISBN 978-0-8032-3012-5.
