= Defend Music =

American music publishing company and music rights administrator

- Industry: Music publishing; Music rights administration
- Founded: 2004; 22 years ago
- Founder: Michael Prommer
- Headquarters: Los Angeles, California, United States

Defend Music is an independent music publishing company and music rights administrator based in Los Angeles. The firm was formed in 2004 by German expatriate Michael Prommer. The company is known for publishing the songs of soul music group Sharon Jones & The Dap-Kings and other writers and artists on Daptone Records, and publishes shares of songs by artists Jay-Z, Black Eyed Peas, Kaskade and others.

In its early years, Defend also offered music distribution services and had a record label that released music by Simian Mobile Disco, 9th Wonder and others.

Outside of North America, Defend Music's songs are sub-published by Kobalt.
