= Lester Hyman =

American attorney, writer and founding partner of Swidler Berlin

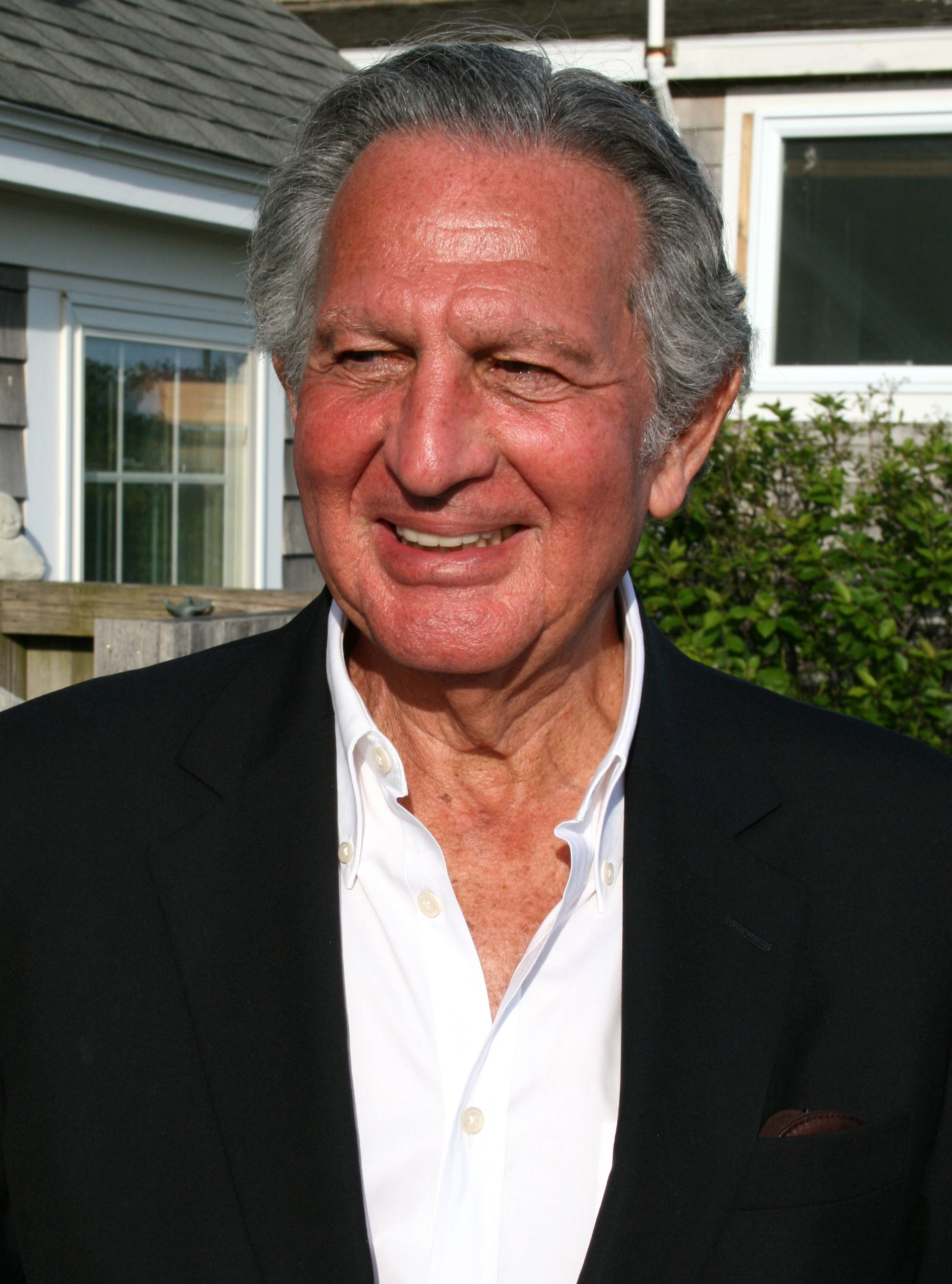
Hyman in 2011

Lester S. Hyman (July 14, 1931 — May 9, 2025) was an American attorney and writer who was a founding partner of law firm Swidler Berlin.

Hyman lived in Washington, D.C., and had a home on the Caribbean island of Tortola, where he was a board member of H. Lavity Stoutt Community College and the National Parks Trust in the British Virgin Islands. He also acted as a United States legal counsel for the BVI.

== Education ==
Hyman graduated from Brown University in 1952 with a Bachelor of Arts degree and from Columbia University School of Law in 1955 with a Bachelor of Law.

== Career ==
=== Clinton administration ===
For the Clinton administration, Hyman vetted candidates for Vice President, Attorney General, Secretary of the Treasury, Director of the CIA, and the U.S. Supreme Court, including preparation for the senatorial confirmation hearings.

In 1994, President Clinton appointed him to the Franklin Delano Roosevelt Memorial Commission, which oversaw the construction of the FDR Memorial in Washington. President Clinton appointed Hyman to the Presidential Delegation, which represented the United States at the 1996 Peace Accord signing in Guatemala that ended a 36-year civil war.

=== Author ===
Hyman's book, United States Policy Towards Liberia, was published by the Africana Homestead Legacy Publishers in 2003. It is based on his time as legal counsel to Liberia from 1997 to 1999 and talks about the humanitarian crisis.

=== Federal and state government ===
In the federal government, Hyman served as an attorney with the Corporation Finance Division of the U.S. Securities & Exchange Commission, and later as a senior consultant to the U.S. Department of Housing and Urban Development. On the state level, he was chief assistant to the governor, then secretary of commerce and development, and later chairman of the Massachusetts Democratic Party.

As a member of the International Observer Team in 1990 headed by former President Jimmy Carter, he monitored the first democratic election in the history of Haiti. Additionally, he has been involved in peace resolution efforts in Africa, as well as legal and governmental issues in Japan, France, Korea, Germany, England, Lebanon, Russia, and the Caribbean.

=== Non-profit board ===
Hyman served on the board of trustees of the Norton Simon Museum in Pasadena, California, from 1996 to 1997.

From 2004 to 2007, he was a trustee of the University of the District of Columbia (UDC) and a member of the board of the UDC Foundation. While a member of the board of the International Intellectual Property Institute (IIPI) in 2004, he served as project director for an 18-nation IIPI conference on the creation of the Caribbean Court of Justice.

He was a member of the board and chair of the Legal Advisory Committee of the not-for-profit Center for Advanced Defense Studies (CADS), and has taught a course in "Decision-Making in Politics" at the John F. Kennedy School of Government at Harvard University. He is also a founding member of the board of directors of the Center for National Policy.

Party political offices
Preceded by Gerard F. Doherty	Chairman of the Massachusetts Democratic Party; 1967–1968	Succeeded by David E. Harrison
