= Morning Becomes Eclectic =

American alternative radio program

Morning Becomes Eclectic (MBE) is an American three-hour adult album alternative radio program first aired in 1977 and broadcast live every weekday from KCRW in Santa Monica, California. The show's name is a play on the Eugene O'Neill trilogy of plays, Mourning Becomes Electra.

The program was created by Isabel Holt. MBE was previously hosted by Tom Schnabel (July 1979 - November 1990), Chris Douridas (1990 - 1998), and Nic Harcourt (1998 - November 2008). Jason Bentley followed Harcourt as host in 2008. He announced that he was relinquishing his duties as music director and host of Morning Becomes Eclectic after 10 years on August 30, 2019. Anne Litt, the station's current program director of music, served as host from January 2020 until February 2021. In December 2020, Novena Carmel and Anthony Valadez were named as the new hosts, beginning their tenure on February 2, 2021. On January 10, 2024, the LA Times confirmed that Anthony Valadez had departed from MBE and KCRW as one of 16 station staff accepting restructuring-related buyout packages to address a $3 million budget deficit at the station.

The show is repeated twice on KCRW's music webcast, and live performances are also sometimes available as audio and video podcasts. Typically, the show features two or three live performances each week during the last hour of the day's broadcast.

== KCRW Sounds Eclectico ==
KCRW Sounds Eclectico is a compilation album featuring live performances by leading Latin alternative artists on Morning Becomes Eclectic. The album was released by Nacional Records and co-produced by the show's host Nic Harcourt and veteran Latin rock artist manager Tomas Cookman.

The KCRW Sounds Eclectico track listing features acts such as Julieta Venegas, Brazilian Girls, Manu Chao, Ozomatli, Café Tacvba, Kinky, Thievery Corporation, Aterciopelados, Sidestepper and Plastilina Mosh. Participating artists donated their proceeds from their live performances to KCRW, with the funds directed towards the support of music programming on the station. Some of the recordings were re-broadcast on the weekly syndicated program "Sounds Eclectic" distributed by Public Radio International. All performances were recorded live to two track digital audio tape and/or Pro Tools sessions and can be found archived in their entirety at KCRW. The album artwork was designed by Beck.

=== Track listing ===
- Café Tacvba – La Muerte Chiquita
- Julieta Venegas – Lo Que Pidas
- Sidestepper – Deja
- Juana Molina – Insensible
- Jorge Drexler – El Pianista del Gueto de Varsovia
- Thievery Corporation – Shadows of Ourselves
- Plastilina Mosh – Baretta 89
- Aterciopelados – Baracunatana
- Los Amigos Invisibles – Gorditas de Mario
- Manu Chao – Clandestino
- Omara Portuondo - No Me Vayas a Enganar
- Brazilian Girls – Homme
- Los Lobos – Carabina 30–30
- Ozomatli – Saturday Night
- Kinky – Sol (Batucada)
- El Gran Silencio – Sound System Municipal
