= Nic Harcourt =

American radio presenter

- Born: September 23, 1957 (age 68); Birmingham, England
- Occupations: Radio and television presenter; producer; journalist

Nic Harcourt (born September 23, 1957) is an English-born American radio and television presenter, producer and journalist best known as the former music director and on-air presenter for the Santa Monica, California-based radio station KCRW. Harcourt hosts the weekday More Music in the Morning with Nic and Jet and Nic at Six at KCSN in Northridge, California.

== Life and career ==
Born in Birmingham, England, Harcourt lived in Lichfield, England, and Brisbane, Australia, before moving to the United States. Before joining KCRW, Harcourt worked for eight years (1990–1998) as a news director and later morning drive show host, music director and program director at radio station WDST in Woodstock, New York, which he described as "an innovative commercial station ... renowned as a bastion of new music, always being ahead of the curve". Leaving WDST after it changed owners in 1998, he joined KCRW to host and edit the daily radio show Morning Becomes Eclectic. He later wrote, "my new job was a very different proposition from the controlled playlist of commercial radio. All of a sudden I found myself with the greatest job in radio where I was allowed to play anything I like and go as deep into an album as I wanted to."

The shows, broadcast live in Los Angeles, often featured live performances by artists both popular and obscure. They included Dido and Travis who have credited Harcourt for recognizing them early in their career. Harcourt was also credited with helping to launch Coldplay's career as well as those of Norah Jones, Sigur Ros, David Gray, Adele, Arctic Monkeys and Metric.

A weekly version of the show called Sounds Eclectic, launched in 2000, was broadcast on several other stations in cooperation with PRI.

On November 10, 2008, Harcourt announced that he would be leaving his role with Morning Becomes Eclectic and resigning as music director for KCRW as of November 30, 2008, while taking on a new show on Sundays. KCRW management selected Jason Bentley to replace Harcourt on both Morning Becomes Eclectic and as music director.

With his reduced role at KCRW, Harcourt founded his own company, SamLuna Media Inc., to develop TV and movie projects. Harcourt continued to do his Sunday show at KCRW until June 2011, when he took on a new show at KCSN called Connections with Nic Harcourt Harcourt was hoping that he could have done his shows on both stations as he was not getting paid by KCSN. On October 19, 2012 Harcourt debuted his weekday morning show on KCSN, called Mornings Are Electric. Harcourt also became Music Supervisor in residence for MTV in March 2011 and many thought he left KCRW for this reason due to a press release from KCRW mentioning his new job. Harcourt denied this in an interview with the Los Angeles Times and said the real reason he had to leave KCRW was because of his new show on KCSN and that KCRW management would not let him do shows on both stations. In October 2011 he became the host of the morning (6 am–11 am) drive music show at KCSN (KCSN Morning Show with Nic Harcourt). In September 2015 his show moved to the midday (11 am–3 pm) time slot (KCSN Midday Music Mix with Nic Harcourt). In 2017 he returned to the morning show.

=== Other media and later career ===
In 2005 Harcourt published Music Lust, a book of "recommended listening for every mood, moment and reason." He has also worked as music consultant/supervisor for several television shows and movies, including: Ben Affleck's Gone Baby Gone (2007), Love Monkey, The Dukes of Hazzard, Life As We Know It, Igby Goes Down and the first season of the rebooted teen drama 90210 (TV series). Harcourt was also the American national voiceover talent from 2005 thru 2008 for the Land Rover advertising campaign.

Harcourt has also served as Editor at Large: Music and Culture for LA: Los Angeles Times Magazine (2009–10).

He produced and hosted a short-lived live performance music website called TheLiveBuzz in the fall of 2010 and was also the first Music Supervisor in Residence at MTV (2011-2012). He is currently the host and interviewer for DirecTV's "Guitar Center Sessions" (2010 onwards) and also hosted a performance/interview podcast series for Guitar Center (2010-2014).

He also manages Los Angeles based singer/songwriter and producer Kita Klane and has directed several music videos for her.
