= Tom Schnabel =

Music consultant, producer and disc jockey (born 1947)

Thomas Daniel Schnabel (born February 5, 1947, in Los Angeles) is a music consultant, producer and DJ. Based in Los Angeles, he was formerly the music director at KCRW.

== Early career ==
Tom Schnabel attended USC, The Sorbonne, and UCLA. He later taught high school and college level English and literature courses in Los Angeles, and later ESL in Paris. Schnabel began producing radio for station KCRW in 1977. During his tenure as music director of KCRW (1979–90), KCRW grew from an obscure college station to become one of the most influential public stations in the United States. He developed the eclectic music format, hosting the daily three-hour Morning Becomes Eclectic show, and introduced World Music to public radio. During this time KCRW twice won CMJ's "Best Noncommercial Station" award (1986, 89). Schnabel left KCRW as Music Director in 1990 to broaden his career as a record producer, music consultant, and teacher.

== Music producer, consultant, teacher ==
Schnabel has taught World Music and other courses at UCLA Extension and the Southern California Institute of Architecture. He consults on World Music with the National Academy of Recording Arts and Sciences as well as producing World Music CDs: Trance Planet, 5 volumes (Triloka Records) and Quango World: Voices (Quango/Island). He has consulted for the Palm Pictures/National Geographic series, Palm World Voices. Schnabel has also consulted for various films including Groundhog Day, O Quatrilho, Dinosaur and was music supervisor of John Sayles' Spanish-language feature film Men with Guns.

== Journalist and author ==
Schnabel has written extensively about music for various publications, including The Los Angeles Times, Jazz Magazine (France), Cashbox, Down Beat, Esquire Magazine, Buzz Magazine, and LA Style. He also authored two works of music history and culture: Stolen Moments: Conversations with Contemporary Musicians (Acrobat Books 1988), and Rhythm Planet - The Great World Music Makers (Universe/Rizzoli. 1998).

== Disc jockey ==
Schnabel continues to deejay musical events around Los Angeles. He also hosted a weekend program on KCRW's Cafe L.A., which played a mix of international, new and exotic sounds. His current project on KCRW is Rhythm Planet, a jazz and world-music show which is available for on-demand streaming.

== Music program director ==
Schnabel helps to help direct KCRW’s World Festival series, whose featured artists have included Thievery Corporation, Willie Nelson, Gotan Project, Zero 7, Gilberto Gil, A.R. Rahman, Carlinhos Brown, Youssou N’Dour, The Buena Vista Social Club, Cesária Évora, Femi Kuti and Baaba Maal. His Walt Disney Concert Hall series has featured Ravi Shankar, Miriam Makeba, Alison Krauss, Osvaldo Golijov and Gustavo Santaolalla. Many new and undiscovered world musicians and composers have found international recognition through Schnabel's efforts, through his recordings, airplay, and productions of live concerts in the vibrant Los Angeles music community.

== Awards ==
In July 1998, Schnabel was honored by the French Ministry of Culture with the prestigious French Medal of Arts Chevalier de l'Ordre des Arts et Des Lettres, for his work in "furthering knowledge of World Music in America." He has also been awarded several citations from the City and County of Los Angeles.

== Published works ==
- Stolen Moments: Conversations with Contemporary Musicians, Acrobat Books (1988), ISBN 0-918226-13-9
- Rhythm Planet - The Great World Music Makers, Universe/Rizzoli (1998), ISBN 0-7893-0238-1
