= Nina Simone at Town Hall =

Live album by Nina Simone
- Released: December 1959
- Recorded: 12 September 1959 (live); October 1959 (studio)
- Venue: The Town Hall, New York City
- Genre: Jazz; blues; folk
- Length: 43:28
- Label: Colpix
- Producer: Jack Gold; Bob Blake

Nina Simone chronology
The Amazing Nina Simone (1959)	Nina Simone at Town Hall (1959)	Nina Simone at Newport (1960)

Nina Simone at Town Hall (a.k.a. At Town Hall) is the first live album by American pianist and singer Nina Simone, released in December 1959. It was her third album of that year, her second album for Colpix Records, and her first live album. The basis for the record was Simone's performance at the Town Hall, New York, on 12 September 1959. All of the songs performed at the concert are on the album; however, three of the tracks are studio versions cut the following month.

Professional ratings
Review scores
Source	Rating
AllMusic	5/5 stars

== Background ==
1959 was the year Simone became a star – and much of this has to do with the performance which forms the basis of At Town Hall. In February, earlier that year, Simone's first album, Little Girl Blue, had been released by Bethlehem Records, after it had been lazing in production for fourteen or so months. Somewhat put out by Bethlehem's shenanigans, she'd signed a new deal with Colpix Records in April, and during the same month recorded her second album, The Amazing Nina Simone, which had been released in July. Also, singles had been released for both these albums. The Bethlehem track was even doing well in various charts and looking like it was going to give her a hit with "I Loves You, Porgy" (which it did). "An even bigger milestone" for Simone, writes Alan Light, came in September "when she made her concert debut at New York's Town Hall", and Colpix arranged for this performance to be recorded. Nadine Cohodas, in Princess Noire: The Tumultuous Reign of Nina Simone (2010), writes, "The August 29 issue of the New York Amsterdam News ran a long piece about the concert series 'Jazz at Town Hall,' devoting much of the story to Nina [...] the article extolled Nina as 'a rare commodity' [...] The story was a prelude to her biggest outing yet. The promoters for Town Hall, the venerable auditorium just off Times Square, had booked her as the headliner" on a bill with the Horace Silver and J. J. Johnson quintets.

Simone had only played clubs before this. As Cohodas continues, "Just how different Town Hall would be struck Nina right before she went onstage, when she saw the audience sitting in orderly rows—no drinks being served, no cigarette girls selling their packs. In the middle of the stage sat a beautiful grand piano, lid off, two microphones carefully placed to capture the instrument and her voice." Kerry Acker tells of a review of the show for The New York Times, where "critic John S. Wilson wrote that Simone 'easily held her own' in the company of Silver and Johnson. She was a commanding performer, and she captivated both audience and critics. Wilson called Simone 'a gifted interpreter, a singer who makes each song her own. [...] By the time she has finished turning a song this way and that way', he wrote, 'poking experimentally into unexpected crannies she finds in it, or suddenly leaping on it and whaling the daylights out of it, the song has lost most of its original colorization and has become, one might say, "Simonized."'"

It is unclear why three of the performances of that evening were swapped out for studio tracks; however, there are two possible reasons where either or both could have been a factor. Cohodas writes that Simone's accompaniment that night was "most likely [Ben] Riley on drums and Wilbur Ware on bass". However, Light goes in to a bit more detail here, stating that Simone "had not rehearsed with, or even met, the musicians who would accompany her on the stage until the curtain rose". Luckily, both Ware and Riley were experienced musicians who had often played with Thelonious Monk. "'If I had the choice in the matter, I wouldn't have done it that way,' she said" quotes Light. Cohodas further observed with many of the songs Simone would begin with long intros so her sidemen could find the groove. Accordingly, the original version of the songs swapped out for studio version – "The Other Woman", "Cotton-Eyed Joe", and "Wild Is the Wind" – could have been felt to be too long or not good enough (or at least worth improving upon) for release.

== Track listing ==
No.	Title	Writer(s)	Length
1.	"Black Is the Color of My True Love's Hair"	Traditional	3:31
2.	"Exactly Like You"	Jimmy McHugh; Dorothy Fields	3:13
3.	"The Other Woman" (Studio recording)	Jessie Mae Robinson	3:00
4.	"Under the Lowest"	Simone	5:32
5.	"You Can Have Him"	Irving Berlin	5:49
6.	"Summertime" (Part I – instrumental)	George Gershwin; Ira Gershwin; DuBose Heyward	2:54
7.	"Summertime" (Part II – vocal)	George Gershwin; Ira Gershwin; DuBose Heyward	2:41
8.	"Cotton-Eyed Joe" (Studio recording)	Traditional	2:51
9.	"Return Home"	Simone	5:27
10.	"Wild Is the Wind" (Studio recording)	Dimitri Tiomkin; Ned Washington	3:28
11.	"Fine and Mellow"	Billie Holiday; Arthur Herzog Jr.	3:32
Total length:			43:28

== Personnel ==
- Nina Simone – vocals, piano

Live

- Wilbur Ware – double bass
- Ben Riley – drums

== Contemporary Singles from the album ==
This is a list of contemporary singles with tracks from Nina Simone at Town Hall as an A Side.

Date	Title: A-side / B-side	Notes
1959-11	"The Other Woman" [Studio] / "Solitaire"	A: Nina Simone at Town Hall / B: The Amazing Nina Simone (1959)
1960-03	"Summertime" [Part II – vocal; live] / "Fine and Mellow" [Live]	Both tracks from Nina Simone at Town Hall

Between 1959 and 1963, Colpix issued 14 Nina Simone singles. The first two were from her first Colpix album (and second album overall), The Amazing Nina Simone (1959); the second two are listed above, with A-sides from Nina Simone at Town Hall. A number of subsequent singles which had A-sides taken from later albums or were non-album tracks would feature some cuts from Nina Simone at Town Hall as B-sides. These are her sixth, seventh, eighth, and tenth Colpix singles.

Date	Title: A-side / B-side	Notes
1960-07	"If Only for Tonight" / "Under the Lowest" [Short version; live]	A: Non-album track / B: Nina Simone at Town Hall
1960-08	"Nobody Knows You When You're Down and Out" / "Black Is the Color of My True Love's Hair" [Live]	A: Non-album track / B: Nina Simone at Town Hall
1960-11	"Trouble in Mind" [Live; short version] / "Cotton-Eyed Joe" [Studio]	A: Nina Simone at Newport (1960) / B: Nina Simone at Town Hall
1961-08	"Gin House Blues" / "You Can Have Him" [Live]	A: Forbidden Fruit (1961) / B: Nina Simone at Town Hall

== Songs ==
- "Black Is the Color of My True Love's Hair" is also featured on the albums Wild Is the Wind (1966) and Black Gold (1970).
- "The Other Woman" was written by Jessie Mae Robinson and is also featured on the albums Nina Simone at Carnegie Hall (1963), Let It All Out (1966), and Live at Ronnie Scott's (1984). The song was covered by American singer-songwriter Lana Del Rey and is the eleventh track on her third studio album, Ultraviolence (2014).
- "Wild Is the Wind" is also featured on the album Wild Is the Wind (1966).
