= Nina Simone at Newport =

Live album by Nina Simone
- Released: August 1960
- Recorded: 30 June 1960
- Venues: Newport Jazz Festival Newport, Rhode Island
- Genres: Vocal, jazz, blues, folk
- Length: 40:31
- Labels: Colpix; CP-412 (Mono), SCP 412 (Stereo)
- Producer: Stu Phillips

Nina Simone chronology
Nina Simone at Town Hall (1959)	Nina Simone at Newport (1960)	Forbidden Fruit (1961)

Nina Simone at Newport is a live album by jazz singer and musician Nina Simone. It was released in August 1960; the recording taken from a concert held at the Newport Jazz Festival earlier in the year, on 30 June 1960. The album was her fourth overall, and her third for Colpix; it was also her second live album, following on from Nina Simone at Town Hall (1959) released at the end of the previous year. All arrangements on Nina Simone at Newport were written by Simone, and it was produced by Stu Phillips.

== Overview ==
Simone had been prolific in 1959, the year of her first releases. There had been three albums, Little Girl Blue (February 1959), from Bethlehem Records, and from Colpix Records, The Amazing Nina Simone (July 1959) and Nina Simone at Town Hall (December 1959). The first two had been studio albums, while At Town Hall had been a live album (albeit with three tracks re-recorded in the studio). She had also had a number of singles released from both Bethlehem Records and Colpix Records, with an early track from Little Girl Blue becoming a hit: 'I Loves You, Porgy' (1959).

In the wake of her successes in 1959, Simone was headlining at concert halls and clubs and touring extensively during 1960. On 30 June that year came the band's biggest gig yet - the fifth annual Newport Jazz Festival. The gig was recorded and released around a month later in August 1960.

== Track listing ==
No.	Title	Writer(s)	Length
1.	"Trouble in Mind"	Richard M. Jones	5:42
2.	"Porgy"	Jimmy McHugh, Dorothy Fields	5:11
3.	"Little Liza Jane"	Traditional	4:34
4.	"You'd Be So Nice to Come Home To"	Cole Porter	5:25
5.	"Flo Me La"	Nina Simone	7:12
6.	"Nina's Blues"	Nina Simone	6:11
7.	"In the Evening by the Moonlight"	Traditional	6:16

== Personnel ==
- Nina Simone – vocals, piano
- Al Schackman – guitar
- Chris White – bass
- Bobby Hamilton – drums
