= Ocean Drive =

Ocean Drive may refer to:

== Locations ==
- Ocean Drive Beach, a community in South Carolina that is now a part of the city of North Myrtle Beach
- Streets:
  - Ocean Drive (South Beach) in South Beach, Miami Beach, Florida
  - Ocean Drive (New Jersey), a road along the Atlantic Ocean from Atlantic City to Cape May in New Jersey, USA
  - Ocean Drive along the south shore of Newport, Rhode Island, also the Ocean Drive Historic District, a U.S. National Historic Landmark
  - Ocean Drive (North Myrtle Beach), in South Carolina

== Music ==
- Ocean Drive (band), French electro band
- Ocean Drive (album), a 1996 album by the Lighthouse Family
  - "Ocean Drive" (Lighthouse Family song)
- Ocean Drive, the debut album from Johntá Austin
- "Ocean Drive" (Duke Dumont song)
- "Ocean Drive," a single by electronica duo Madison Park
- "Ocean Drive," a single by rapper 21 Savage from the EP Savage Mode

== Others ==
- Ocean Drive (magazine), fashion and lifestyle magazine based in South Florida
- A drop-top concept version of the Mercedes-Benz S-Class (W221)

== See also ==
- "Ocean Drive Avenue", a single from French reality television series Les Anges
