= The Amazing Nina Simone =

Studio album by Nina Simone
- Released: July 1959
- Recorded: April 1959
- Studio: Van Gelder Studio, Hackensack, New Jersey
- Genre: Vocal jazz, jazz, blues, gospel
- Length: 33:31
- Label: Colpix
- Producer: Hecky Krasnow

Nina Simone chronology
Little Girl Blue (1959)	The Amazing Nina Simone (1959)	Nina Simone at Town Hall (1959)

The Amazing Nina Simone is the second studio album by Nina Simone, released in July 1959. It was her second album, and her first recording for Colpix Records. The album contains a variety of material, including jazz, gospel, and folk songs. Compared to her debut, which showcased Simone's piano playing ability in addition to her singing, the piano was downplayed on Amazing in favor of string arrangements.

Professional ratings
Review scores
Source	Rating
AllMusic	4.5/5 stars
The Encyclopedia of Popular Music	4/5 stars

== Overview ==
=== Recording ===
Simone's first album Little Girl Blue had been released by Bethlehem Records in February 1959. However, the tracks for that album had been recorded way back in late 1957, and Simone was dissatisfied by the time it took for Bethlehem to release the album as well as the lack of effort the record company took in promoting her. Soon after Little Girl Blue was released she was talking to Colpix Records about a new contract. As Nadine Cohodas puts it in Princess Noire: The Tumultuous Reign of Nina Simone (2010): 'Unbeknownst to Nina, discussions about her career were going forward on two fronts'. On the one hand, at Bethlehem, Simone's contract was approaching its option. New owner Syd Nathan, who ran King Records and who had recently bailed out the ailing Bethlehem, did not want to renew. 'We don't need the broad' he told Gus Wildi, Bethlehem's founder. On the other hand, Joyce Selznick (niece of the producer David O. Selznick and East Coast talent scout for Columbia Pictures) wanted Simone at Colpix - Columbia's record division. Selznick arranged an audition, and Simone was signed immediately.

The album was recorded in April 1959, and - according to Cohodas - 14 tracks were cut.

=== Release ===
The album was released in July 1959. In a review dated 25 July 1959 in Cash Box, the premier American music industry trade magazine of the time, the reviewer wrote: 'Emerging as one of the bright new singing talents of the year, Nina Simone makes her Colpix LP debut [...] Her deep-toned expressive voice and exquisite phrasing are a listening delight. Outstanding album.' The album featured 12 tracks.

== Track list ==
No.	Title	Lyrics	Music	Length
1.	"Blue Prelude"	Gordon Jenkins	Joe Bishop	3:15
2.	"Children Go Where I Send You"		Simone, Traditional	2:45
3.	"Tomorrow (We Will Meet Once More)"		Jerry Silverman, Stephen Gale	2:56
4.	"Stompin' at the Savoy"	Andy Razaf	Benny Goodman, Chick Webb, Edgar Sampson	2:05
5.	"It Might as Well Be Spring"	Oscar Hammerstein II	Richard Rodgers	3:50
6.	"You've Been Gone Too Long"		Brother John Sellers	2:08
7.	"That's Him Over There"	Marilyn Keith	Lew Spence	2:28
8.	"Chilly Winds Don't Blow"		William Lovelock, Hecky Krasnow	2:40
9.	"Theme From Middle of the Night"	Paddy Chayefsky	George Bassman	2:25
10.	"Can't Get Out of This Mood"	Frank Loesser	Jimmy McHugh	2:30
11.	"Willow Weep for Me"		Ann Ronell	3:10
12.	"Solitaire"	Carl Nutter, Renee Borek	King Guion	3:20
Total length:				33:31

== Personnel ==
- Nina Simone – vocals, piano
- Bob Mersey – arrangement, conductor

== Contemporary Singles from the album ==
This is a list of contemporary singles with tracks from The Amazing Nina Simone as an A-side.

Year	Month	Title: A Side / B Side	Notes
1959	June	'Chilly Winds Don't Blow' / 'Solitaire'	Both tracks from The Amazing Nina Simone
1959	September	'Children Go Where I Send You' / 'Willow Weep For Me'	Both tracks from The Amazing Nina Simone

Between 1959 and 1963, Colpix issued 14 Nina Simone singles. The first two are listed above, with A Sides from The Amazing Nina Simone. A number of subsequent singles which had A Sides taken from later albums or were non-album tracks would feature some cuts from The Amazing Nina Simone as B Sides. These are her third, fifth, eleventh, and twelfth Colpix singles.

Year	Month	Title: A Side / B Side	Notes
1959	November	'The Other Woman' / 'It Might As Well Be Spring'	A: At Town Hall (1959) / B: The Amazing Nina Simone
1960	May	'Since My Love Has Gone' / 'Tomorrow (We Shall Meet Once More)'	A: Non-album track / B: The Amazing Nina Simone
1961	December	'Come On Back, Jack' / 'You've Been Gone Too Long'	A: Non-album track / B: The Amazing Nina Simone
1962	March	'In The Evening By The Moonlight' / 'Chilly Winds Don't Blow'	A: At Newport (1960) / B: The Amazing Nina Simone and already appeared on single as an A-Side

== Reissues ==
The Amazing Nina Simone was reissued in 2005 with the same track listing but with four additional songs ('I Loves You Porgy', 'Falling In Love Again (I Can't Help It)', 'That's All', and 'The Man With A Horn'). All these songs were originally issued on Nina Simone with Strings (1966).
