= Live at Ronnie Scott's (Nina Simone album) =

Live album by Nina Simone
- Released: 1987
- Recorded: November 17, 1984
- Venues: Ronnie Scott's, London
- Genres: Vocal, soul, jazz, folk
- Length: 56:37
- Label: Hendring-Wadham
- Producer: Eddie Singleton

Nina Simone chronology
Let It Be Me (1987)	Live at Ronnie Scott's (1987)	A Single Woman (1993)

Live at Ronnie Scott's is an album by American singer-songwriter Nina Simone. It is a live recording of a concert she gave at Ronnie Scott's Jazz Club in 1984, a London venue where she performed a few times in her later life.

== Information about songs on this album ==
- "Fodder In Her Wings" and "I Sing Just To Know That I'm Alive", Nina first recorded these self-written songs on Fodder On My Wings (1982). Both are very personal to her, talking about Nina's estrangement from people and closing a bad chapter and beginning a new one.
- "Be My Husband", written by her ex-husband and ex-manager Andrew Stroud, first featured on Pastel Blues (1965). Later covered by Jeff Buckley as "Be Your Husband".
- "I Loves You Porgy", her first hit-single from her debut Little Girl Blue (1958).
- "Mississippi Goddam", Nina wrote this civil rights song after four black girls died during a church bombing, first featured on Nina Simone in Concert (1964).
- "Moon over Alabama", together with "Mississippi Goddam". Nina sings this song to show that the two songs have a similar melody. She, therefore, switches between them during the performance.
- "My Baby Just Cares For Me", Nina introduces this last song with:
  I think this is what you've all been waiting for...
  She often did that when performing it live in her later years. It is the song that brought her back into the limelight after it featured in a commercial in 1982, yet it wasn't a song she particularly liked or wished to be remembered by.

== Track listing ==
All music is composed by Nina Simone, except where indicated.

No.	Title	Writer(s)	Length
1.	"God God God"	Paramahansa Yogananda, Simone
2.	"If You Knew"
3.	"Mr. Smith"	Kurt Weill, Bertolt Brecht
4.	"Fodder in Her Wings"
5.	"Be My Husband"	Simone, Andrew Stroud
6.	"I Loves You Porgy"	George Gershwin, Ira Gershwin, DuBose Heyward
7.	"The Other Woman"	Simone, Jessie Mae Robinson
8.	"Mississippi Goddam"
9.	"Moon Over Alabama"	Kurt Weill, Bertolt Brecht
10.	"For a While"	Bob Gaudio, Jake Holmes
11.	"See Line Woman"	George Houston Bass
12.	"I Sing Just to Know That I'm Alive"
13.	"My Baby Just Cares for Me"	Gus Kahn, Walter Donaldson
Total length:			56:37

== Personnel ==
- Nina Simone - vocals, piano
- Paul Robinson - drums
