= Remixed and Reimagined =

Remixed and Reimagined may refer to:

- Remixed and Reimagined (Nina Simone album), the first album in the Legacy Remixed series released by Sony BMG
- Remixed and Reimagined (Billie Holiday album), the second entry in Sony BMG's Legacy Remixed series
