= List of UK Jazz & Blues Albums Chart number ones of 2006 =

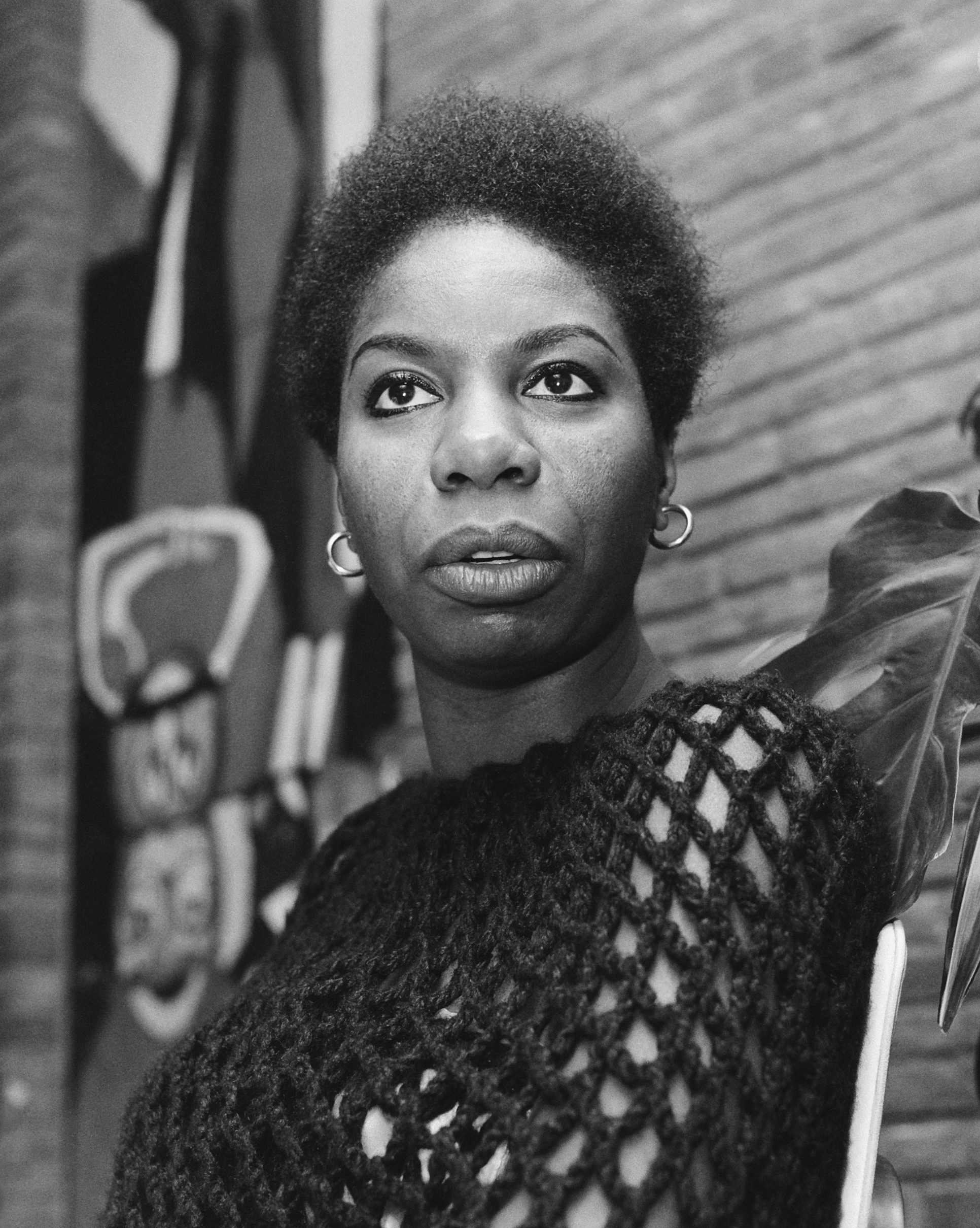
The Nina Simone compilation The Very Best of Nina Simone spent 27 weeks in total at number one on the UK Jazz & Blues Albums Chart in 2006, including a run of 23 consecutive weeks.

The UK Jazz & Blues Albums Chart is a record chart which ranks the best-selling jazz and blues albums in the United Kingdom. Compiled and published by the Official Charts Company, the data is based on each album's weekly physical sales, digital downloads and streams. In 2006, 52 charts were published with ten albums at number one. Michael Bublé's fourth studio album It's Time was the first number-one album of the year, spending the first five weeks of the year atop the chart at the end of a 13-week run starting in 2005. Frank, the debut album by Amy Winehouse, was the last number-one album of the year, reaching the top spot in its 95th week on the chart.

The most successful album on the UK Jazz & Blues Albums Chart in 2006 was The Very Best of Nina Simone, a greatest hits album by Nina Simone, which spent a total of 27 weeks atop the chart over three spells, the longest of which was 23 consecutive weeks between May and October. Norah Jones spent six weeks at number one with her first album Come Away with Me, plus another week with its follow-up Feels Like Home. Michael Bublé had two number-one albums during 2006, with It's Time and Caught in the Act spending five weeks each atop the chart. The Very Best of Nina Simone finished 2006 as the 40th best-selling album of the year in the UK.

== Chart history ==
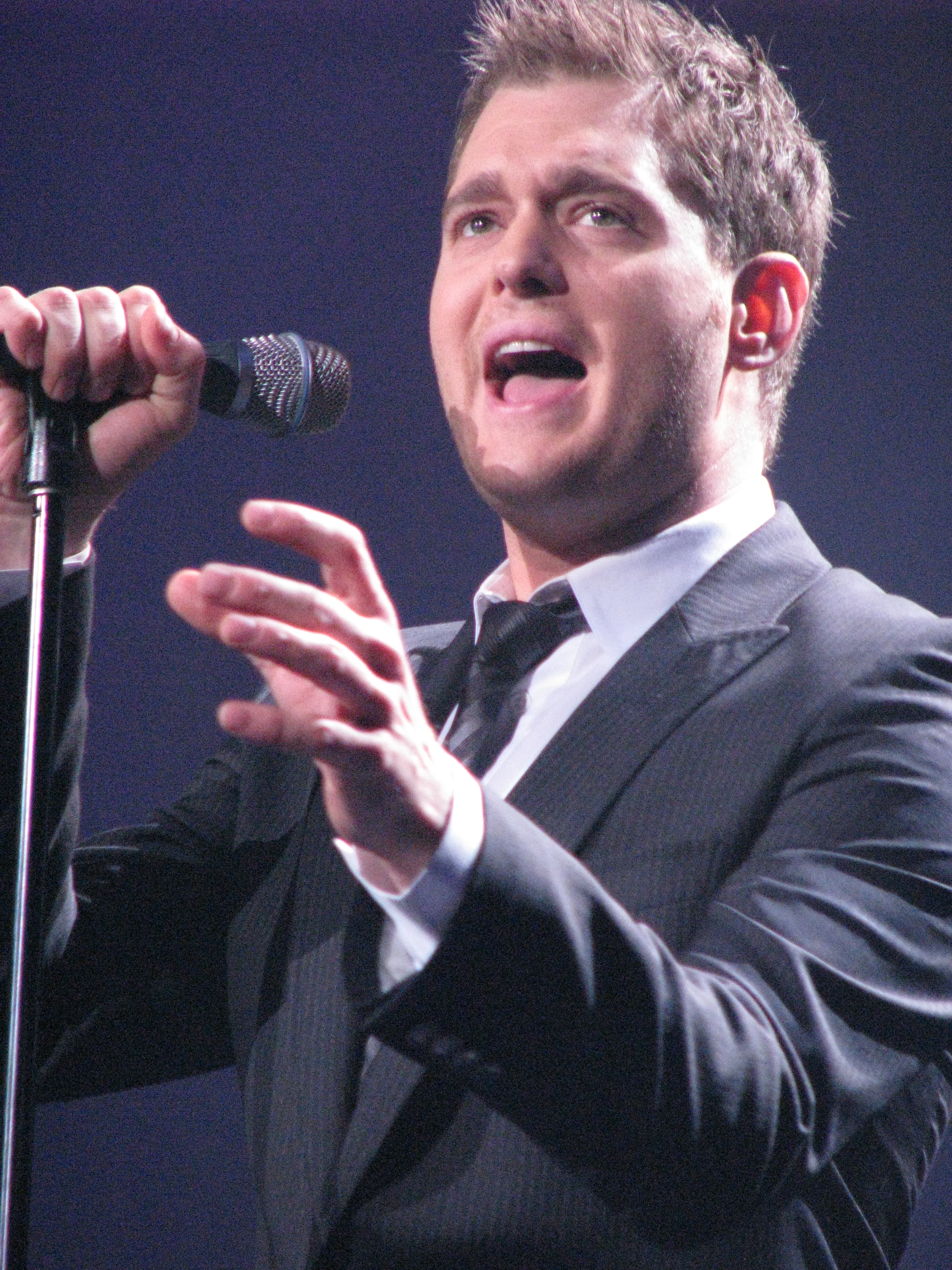
Michael Bublé was number one for the first ten weeks of 2006 with two albums: It's Time and Caught in the Act.

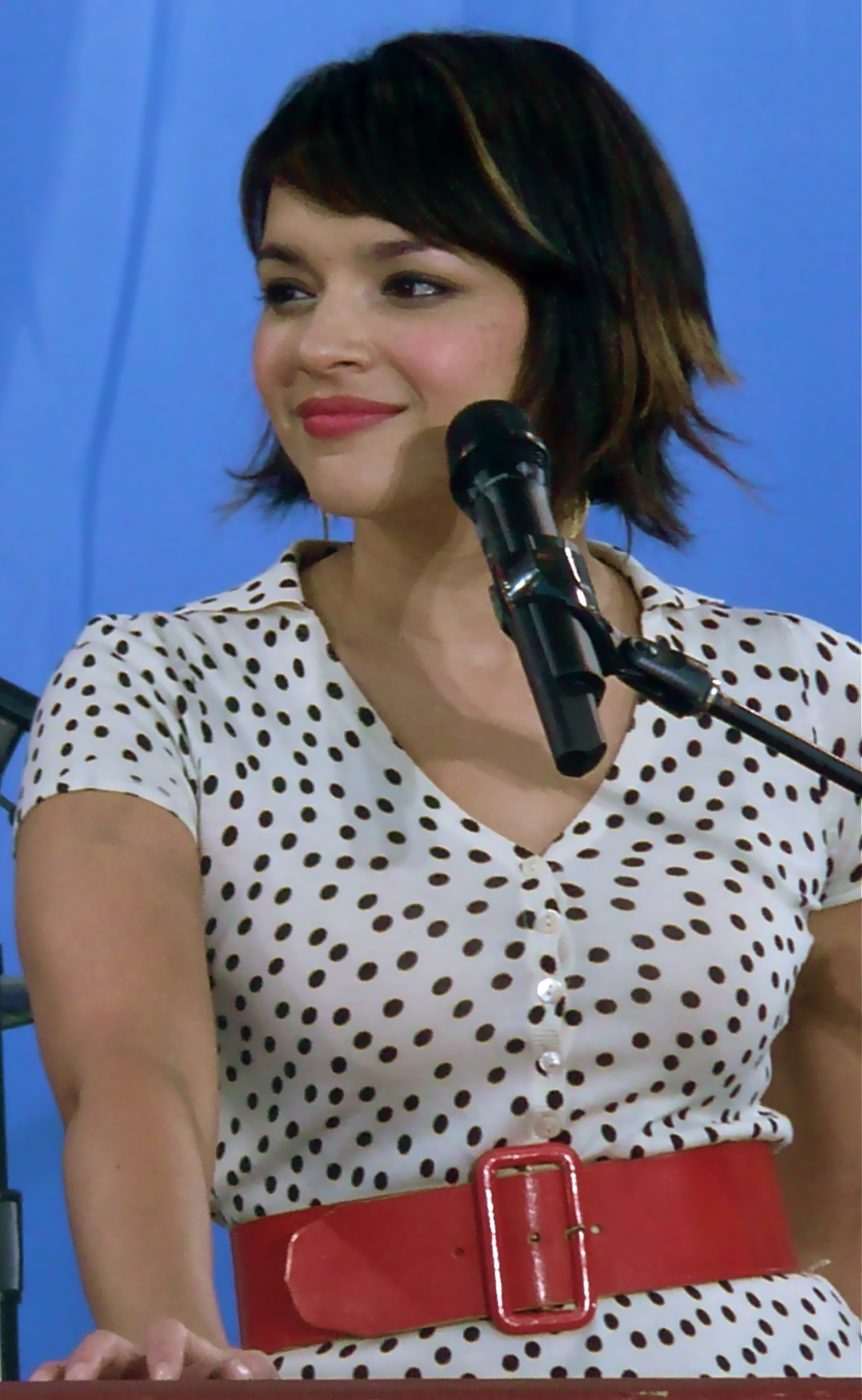
Norah Jones also topped the chart with two different releases during 2006: Come Away with Me for five weeks and Feels Like Home for one.

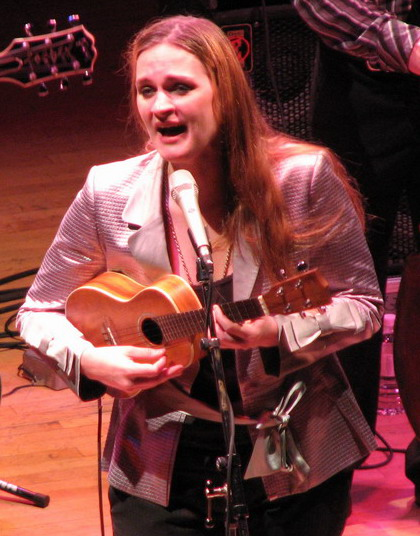
Madeline Peyroux spent three consecutive weeks at number one during November with her fourth studio album, Half the Perfect World.

Key
†	Indicates best-selling jazz/blues album of 2006

Issue date	Album	Artist(s)	Record label(s)	Ref.
1 January	It's Time	Michael Bublé	Reprise	
8 January	It's Time	Michael Bublé	Reprise	
15 January	It's Time	Michael Bublé	Reprise	
22 January	It's Time	Michael Bublé	Reprise	
29 January	It's Time	Michael Bublé	Reprise	
5 February	Caught in the Act	Michael Bublé	Reprise	
12 February	Caught in the Act	Michael Bublé	Reprise	
19 February	Caught in the Act	Michael Bublé	Reprise	
26 February	Caught in the Act	Michael Bublé	Reprise	
5 March	Caught in the Act	Michael Bublé	Reprise	
12 March	Come Away with Me	Norah Jones	Parlophone	
19 March	Come Away with Me	Norah Jones	Parlophone	
26 March	Come Away with Me	Norah Jones	Parlophone	
2 April	Come Away with Me	Norah Jones	Parlophone	
9 April	Come Away with Me	Norah Jones	Parlophone	
16 April	Come Away with Me	Norah Jones	Parlophone	
23 April	The Collection	Curtis Stigers	Concord	
30 April	Feels Like Home	Norah Jones	Blue Note	
7 May	The Very Best of Nina Simone †	Nina Simone	RCA/UCJ	
14 May	The Very Best of Nina Simone †	Nina Simone	RCA/UCJ	
21 May	The Very Best of Nina Simone †	Nina Simone	RCA/UCJ	
28 May	The Very Best of Nina Simone †	Nina Simone	RCA/UCJ	
4 June	The Very Best of Nina Simone †	Nina Simone	RCA/UCJ	
11 June	The Very Best of Nina Simone †	Nina Simone	RCA/UCJ	
18 June	The Very Best of Nina Simone †	Nina Simone	RCA/UCJ	
25 June	The Very Best of Nina Simone †	Nina Simone	RCA/UCJ	
2 July	The Very Best of Nina Simone †	Nina Simone	RCA/UCJ	
9 July	The Very Best of Nina Simone †	Nina Simone	RCA/UCJ	
16 July	The Very Best of Nina Simone †	Nina Simone	RCA/UCJ	
23 July	The Very Best of Nina Simone †	Nina Simone	RCA/UCJ	
30 July	The Very Best of Nina Simone †	Nina Simone	RCA/UCJ	
6 August	The Very Best of Nina Simone †	Nina Simone	RCA/UCJ	
13 August	The Very Best of Nina Simone †	Nina Simone	RCA/UCJ	
20 August	The Very Best of Nina Simone †	Nina Simone	RCA/UCJ	
27 August	The Very Best of Nina Simone †	Nina Simone	RCA/UCJ	
3 September	The Very Best of Nina Simone †	Nina Simone	RCA/UCJ	
10 September	The Very Best of Nina Simone †	Nina Simone	RCA/UCJ	
17 September	The Very Best of Nina Simone †	Nina Simone	RCA/UCJ	
24 September	The Very Best of Nina Simone †	Nina Simone	RCA/UCJ	
1 October	The Very Best of Nina Simone †	Nina Simone	RCA/UCJ	
8 October	The Very Best of Nina Simone †	Nina Simone	RCA/UCJ	
15 October	From This Moment On	Diana Krall	Verve	
22 October	From This Moment On	Diana Krall	Verve	
29 October	The Very Best of Nina Simone †	Nina Simone	RCA/UCJ	
5 November	Half the Perfect World	Madeleine Peyroux	Rounder	
12 November	Half the Perfect World	Madeleine Peyroux	Rounder	
19 November	Half the Perfect World	Madeleine Peyroux	Rounder	
26 November	Bolton Swings Sinatra: The Second Time Around	Michael Bolton	Concord	
3 December	Bolton Swings Sinatra: The Second Time Around	Michael Bolton	Concord	
10 December	The Very Best of Nina Simone †	Nina Simone	RCA/UCJ	
17 December	The Very Best of Nina Simone †	Nina Simone	RCA/UCJ	
24 December	The Very Best of Nina Simone †	Nina Simone	RCA/UCJ	
31 December	Frank	Amy Winehouse	Island	

== See also ==
- 2006 in British music
