= Nina Simone and Her Friends =

Compilation album by Nina Simone, Carmen McRae, Chris Connor
- Released: 1960
- Recorded: 1954; 1957
- Venue: New York (various)
- Genre: Jazz
- Label: Bethlehem

Professional ratings
Review scores
Source	Rating
Allmusic	4.5/5 stars

Nina Simone and Her Friends is an album released in 1960 by the Bethlehem Records label, that compiled songs by jazz singers Nina Simone, Carmen McRae and Chris Connor. All three artists had left the label and signed with other companies by the time Bethlehem released this album. The numbers by Simone - with the exception of her 1959 hit single "I Loves You, Porgy" were "left overs" from the recording sessions for her 1959 debut album Little Girl Blue and released without her knowledge. The tracks by Connor and McRae had already been issued together this way, as Bethlehem's Girlfriends, in 1956, accompanied by the debut recording session of Julie London.

== Notes on songs ==
- "I Loves You, Porgy" had already appeared on Little Girl Blue (1959) and as a single of the same year where it became a Billboard Chart top 20 hit.
- "African Mailman", is an instrumental song by Simone.

== Track listing ==
Side A
No.	Title	Writer(s)	Singer	Length
1.	"He's Got the Whole World in His Hands"	Traditional	Nina Simone
2.	"Cottage for Sale"	Willard Robison, Larry Conley	Chris Connor
3.	"Old Devil Moon"	Burton Lane, E.Y. Harburg	Carmen McRae
4.	"I Loves You, Porgy"	George Gershwin, Ira Gershwin	Nina Simone
5.	"Try a Little Tenderness"	Jimmy Campbell, Reg Connelly, Harry M. Woods	Chris Connor
6.	"You Made Me Care"	Chuck Darwin, Paulette Girard	Carmen McRae

Side B
No.	Title	Writer(s)	Singer	Length
1.	"For All We Know"	J. Fred Coots, Sam M. Lewis	Nina Simone
2.	"What Is There to Say?"	Vernon Duke, E. Y. Harburg	Chris Connor
3.	"Too Much in Love to Care"	Carroll Coates, James J. Kriegsmann	Carmen McRae
4.	"African Mailman"	Nina Simone	Nina Simone
5.	"Good Bye"	Gordon Jenkins	Chris Connor
6.	"Last Time for Love"	Carmen McRae	Carmen McRae

== Personnel (for tracks by Simone only) ==
- Nina Simone – vocals, piano
- Jimmy Bond – bass
- Al "Tootie" Heath – drums
