= The Soul of Nina Simone =

Compilation album by Nina Simone
- Released: October 11, 2005
- Recorded: 1963–1987, Vine Street Bar & Grill, Hollywood, California; RCA Studio B, New York, New York
- Label: RCA

Nina Simone chronology
A Single Woman (1993)	The Soul of Nina Simone (2005)	The Very Best of Nina Simone (2006)

Professional ratings
Review scores
Source	Rating
Tom Hull	B+

The Soul of Nina Simone is a DualDisc, which contains a CD on one side of the disc and a DVD on the other containing footage from her appearance at 1969's Harlem Cultural Festival.

== Track listing ==
1. "Feeling Good"
2. "In the Dark"
3. "Since I Fell For You"
4. "Don't Let Me Be Misunderstood"
5. "To Love Somebody"
6. "My Man's Gone Now"
7. "I Think It's Going to Rain Today"
8. "My Baby Just Cares For Me"
9. "I Want a Little Sugar in My Bowl"
10. "Save Me"
11. "The Look of Love"
12. "I Get Along Without You Very Well"
13. "Just Like Tom Thumb's Blues"
14. "Nobody's Fault But Mine"
15. "Porgy and Bess Medley"

== Personnel ==
- Nina Simone – vocals, piano
- Arthur Adams – guitar, bass
- Everett Barksdale – guitar
- Rudy Stevenson – guitar
- Buddy Lucas – harmonica
- Ernie Hayes – organ
- Chuck Rainey – bass
- Bob Bushnell – bass
- Bernard Purdie – drums
- Cornell McFadden – drums

== Charts ==
Chart (2005)	Peak position
US Traditional Jazz Albums	23
