= The Very Best of Nina Simone =

Greatest hits album by Nina Simone
- Released: 2006
- Genre: Vocal jazz
- Length: 75:22
- Label: Sony BMG

Nina Simone chronology
A Single Woman (1993)	The Very Best of Nina Simone (2006)	Remixed and Reimagined (2006)

The Very Best of Nina Simone is a compilation album of songs by Nina Simone, released by Sony BMG in 2006, three years after her death in 2003.

== Track listing ==
1. "Ain't Got No, I Got Life" – 2:17 (1968)
2. "My Baby Just Cares for Me" – 3:37 (1958)
3. "Feeling Good" – 2:52 (1965)
4. "I Put a Spell on You" – 2:34 (1965)
5. "I Loves You Porgy" – 4:10 (1957)
6. "Don't Let Me Be Misunderstood" – 2:42 (1964)
7. "The Look of Love" – 2:22 (1967)
8. "I Wish I Knew How It Would Feel to Be Free" – 3:08 (1967)
9. "I Want a Little Sugar in My Bowl" – 2:32 (1967)
10. "Do I Move You" – 2:45 (1967)
11. "Do What You Gotta Do" – 3:35 (1968)
12. "To Be Young, Gifted and Black" – 2:48 (1970)
13. "Since I Fell for You" – 2:49 (1967)
14. "Nobody's Fault But Mine" – 2:58 (1970)
15. "I Think It's Going to Rain Today" – 3:20 (1969)
16. "Sinnerman" – 10:21 (1965)
17. "The Times They Are a-Changin'" – 5:59 (1969)
18. "Mr. Bojangles" – 4:59 (1968)
19. "Here Comes the Sun" – 3:33 (1971)
20. "To Love Somebody" – 2:39 (1969)
21. "Ain't Got No, I Got Life" (Nina Simone V Groovefinder remix) – 3:22 (2006)

== Charts ==
Chart (2006–2015)	Peak position
French Albums (SNEP)	126
New Zealand Albums (RMNZ)	25
Portuguese Albums (AFP)	12
UK Albums (OCC)	6

== Certifications ==
Region	Certification	Certified units/sales
United Kingdom (BPI)	2× Platinum	600,000^{^}
^{^} Shipments figures based on certification alone.
