= Fine and Mellow =

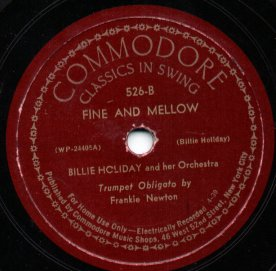

Single by Billie Holiday
- A-side: "Strange Fruit"
- Released: 1939
- Recorded: April 20, 1939
- Genre: Jazz
- Label: Commodore
- Songwriter: Billie Holiday

Billie Holiday singles chronology
"I'm Gonna Lock My Heart" (1938)	"Fine and Mellow" (1939)	"God Bless the Child" (1942)

"Fine and Mellow" is a jazz standard written by Billie Holiday, who first recorded it on April 20, 1939 on the Commodore label. It is a blues lamenting the bad treatment of a woman at the hands of "my man".

== Notable performances and recordings ==
The song was famously performed by Billie Holiday in 1957 in a television special, The Sound of Jazz. The line-up included several jazz legends (the first six are listed in the order of their solos):

- Ben Webster – tenor saxophone
- Lester Young – tenor saxophone
- Vic Dickenson – trombone
- Gerry Mulligan – baritone saxophone
- Coleman Hawkins – tenor saxophone
- Roy Eldridge – trumpet
- Doc Cheatham – trumpet
- Danny Barker – guitar
- Milt Hinton – double bass
- Mal Waldron – piano
- Osie Johnson – drums

It has been covered several times, sometimes with a change in lyrics or emphasis. For example, Lou Rawls switched the gender to a girlfriend and Eva Cassidy sang it in a defiant tone. Notable cover versions were sung by Nina Simone (on the 1959 At Town Hall), Dee Dee Bridgewater on her Billie Holiday tribute album, and Ella Fitzgerald on her eponymous album.
