= Merrill Joels =

American actor (1909–2001)

Merrill E. Joels
- Merrill Joels in The Godfather (1972)
- Born: January 19, 1909; Hartford, Connecticut, U.S.
- Died: September 5, 2001 (age 92); Guthrie, Oklahoma, U.S.
- Occupation: actor
- Known for: work with Frank Buck
- Spouse: Marion Joels (1945-2001, his death)

Merrill E. Joels (January 19, 1909, Hartford, Connecticut – September 5, 2001 (age 92) Guthrie, Oklahoma) was an actor in the Frank Buck recording Tiger (record album).

== Early life ==
Merrill Joels was the son of Abram J. and Rose (Wershwofsky) Joels. Merrill was born in the house that was torn down for the construction of what is now the Hartford Courant building.

== Career ==
In 1929 Merrill E. Joels began as an usher at Parson's, the Hartford stage tryout theater. He was a professional actor for 40 years. He was a member of the Christian Science Church, vice president of the American Federation of Radio and Television Artists in New York, and served on the national board of directors of the Screen Actors Guild. In 1932 he founded the Mark Twain Masquers Community Theatre in Hartford.

Joels was the announcer on NBC-TV's Versatile Varieties in the late 1940s and early 1950s.

== Work with Frank Buck ==
In 1950, Joels read the part of Captain Harry Curtis in Frank Buck’s recording Tiger (record album).

== Other record albums ==
Snow White and the Seven Dwarfs. Joels, Merrill E. and supporting cast, with Glenn Osser and his Orchestra; original music and story adaptation by Paul Davis. Caravan Records, New York, 1950. LP Record.

== Author ==
Joels was author of two books:

- How to Get into Show Business. Hastings House, New York, 1969.
- Acting is a Business: How to Get Into Television and Radio. Hastings House, New York, 1955.

== Radio ==
- Series: "ISN'T IT A CRIME" WNEW-NEW YORK. SUSTAINING HOST: Jerry Marshall.

Episode 13 "SPEAKING OF MURDER" date: 12-14-45 time: 29:00 cast: K.C. Allen, Eleanora Reid, Leonard Sherrer, Jason Johnson, Eileen Court, Merrill E. Joels.

- Other radio series with Merrill Joels include “Counterspy (radio series)”; “Aunt Jenny's Real Life Stories”; “The Big Story (radio/TV)”

Hosted "The Jewish Home Show"

== Selected filmography ==
- The Godfather (1972) - Toll Both Collector (uncredited)
