= Southernaires =

American popular vocal group (1929–1950s)

The Southernaires
- Ray Yeates (tenor, far left), Lowell Peters (second tenor), Jay Stone Toney (baritone), William W. Edmunson (bass, center), and Spencer Odom (accompanist/arranger, far right).

Background information
- Origin: United States
- Years active: 1929–1950s

The Southernaires, organized in 1929, were an American popular vocal group, popular in radio broadcasting of the 1930s and 1940s. They were known for their renditions of spirituals and work songs. In 1942, they won a widely publicized case of hotel discrimination.

Their best known recording, "Nobody Knows De Trouble I've Seen", was released by Decca (2859-B) in 1939. Pianist-arranger Spencer Odom replaced their previous accompanist, Clarence M. Jones, the same year.

In 1948–49, they hosted a 30-minute show, The Southernaires Quartet, on Sundays on the American Broadcasting Company television network.

== Work with Frank Buck ==
In 1950, the Southernaires provided the vocals for the Frank Buck album, Tiger.

== Key personnel ==
- Homer Smith (tenor)
- Lowell Peters (second tenor)
- Jay Stone Toney (baritone)
- William W. Edmunson (bass/narrator)
- Clarence M. Jones (pianist from 1933)
- Ray Yeates (tenor, replacing Smith from 1945 onwards)
- Spencer Odom (pianist/arranger, replacing Jones in 1939)

By 1951, they had only one original member, Edmunson, in their line-up

== See also ==
- 1948–49 United States network television schedule
