= Castle Hill Light =

Lighthouse in Newport, Rhode Island, US

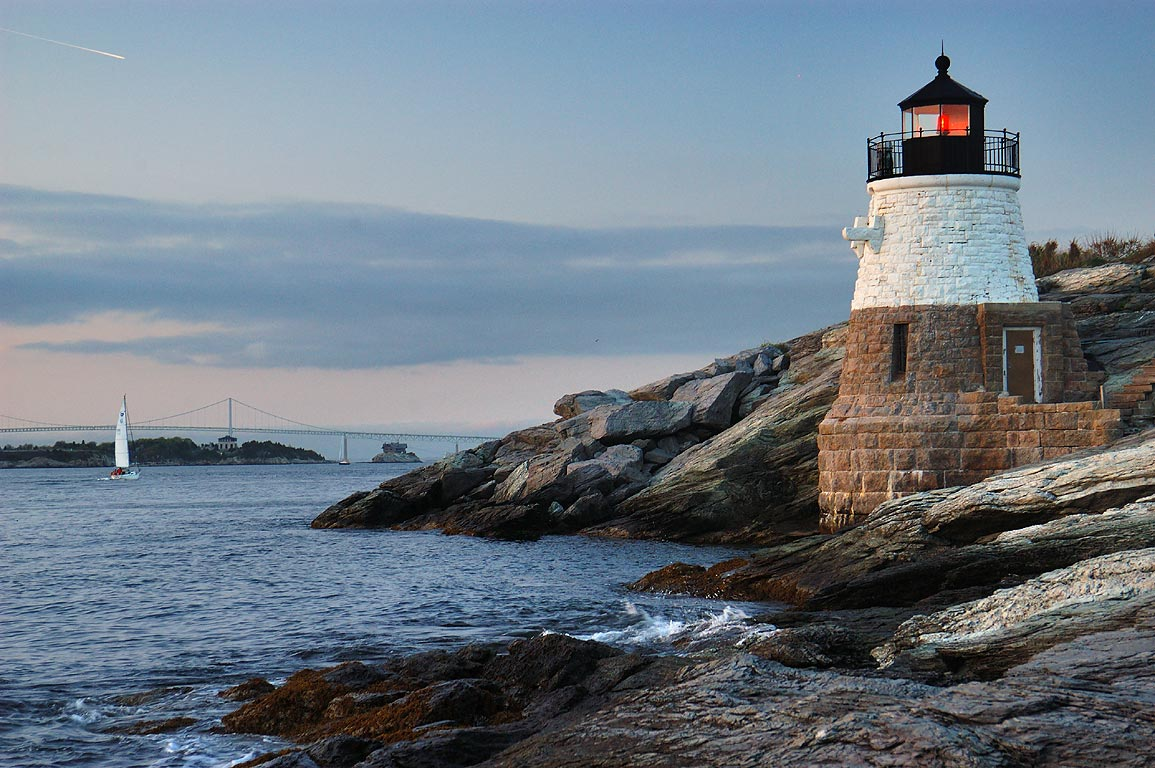
- Location: Off Ocean Ave. on Castle Hill at W end of Newport Neck, Newport, Rhode Island
- Coordinates: 41°27′43″N 71°21′47″W

Tower
- Constructed: 1890
- Construction: granite
- Automated: 1957
- Height: 10 m (33 ft)
- Shape: conical
- Heritage: National Register of Historic Places listed place
- Fog signal: Horn, 1 every 10 sec.

Light
- First lit: 1890
- Focal height: 12 m (39 ft)
- Lens: Fifth order Fresnel lens (original), 12 inches (300 mm) (current)
- Range: 12 nmi (22 km; 14 mi)
- Characteristic: Iso R 6s
- Castle Hill Light
- U.S. National Register of Historic Places
- U.S. National Historic Landmark District – Contributing property
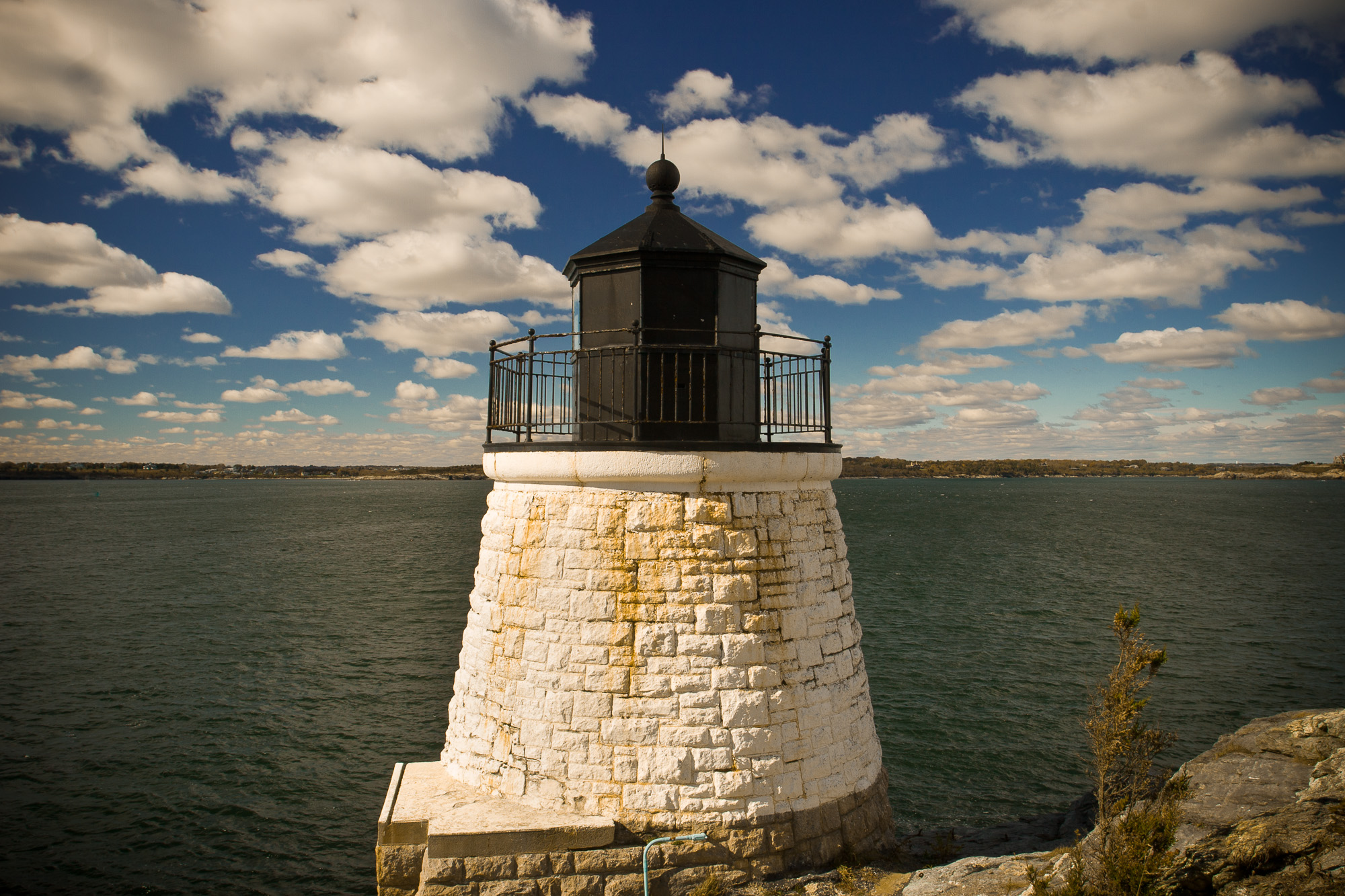
- Architect: H.H. Richardson
- Architectural style: Romanesque
- Part of: Ocean Drive Historic District (ID76000048)
- MPS: Lighthouses of Rhode Island TR
- NRHP reference No.: 88000277

Significant dates
- Added to NRHP: March 30, 1988
- Designated NHLDCP: May 11, 1976

Castle Hill Lighthouse is located on Narragansett Bay in Newport, Rhode Island, at the end of the historic Ocean Drive. It is an active navigation aid for vessels entering the East Passage, between Conanicut Island and Aquidneck Island. The lighthouse has become a symbol of Newport, and a frequent site for wedding photos, proposals, and tourist photos. Although the property is owned by the nearby Castle Hill Inn, the lighthouse is owned by the United States Coast Guard.

== History ==
Henry Hobson Richardson drew a sketch for a lighthouse at this location which may or may not have been the basis for the actual design. The structure does not include the residence which was featured in Richardson's sketch. The keeper's house was built, and still stands, near Castle Hill Cove, a few hundred feet away.

The lighthouse was completed in 1890 on property formerly belonging to the naturalist, oceanographer, and zoologist Alexander Agassiz of Harvard University. Agassiz sold the land to the United States Government for the lighthouse for $1. His mansion on the property, commissioned in 1874, is now an inn. It was added to the National Register of Historic Places in 1988 as Castle Hill Lighthouse.

Although the lighthouse building is not open to the public, the shoreline and cliff face where the lighthouse sits are accessible by several footpaths from the Castle Hill Inn and the Castle Hill Cove Marina. The lighthouse is a popular site for tourist photos and wedding shoots, and widely recognizable as a symbol of Newport. While the property is owned by the nearby Castle Hill Inn, the lighthouse itself is owned by the United States Coast Guard.

=== 2021 repainting ===
By 2020, the lighthouse had become streaked with rust, and the Coast Guard indicated that it had no plans to perform any exterior maintenance.

In March 2021, the Castle Hill Inn signed a five-year agreement with the Coast Guard to refresh the lighthouse's exterior appearance. A local contractor was hired to perform a full power wash, paint, and beautification at a cost of $17,000, just in time for the 2021 summer wedding season.

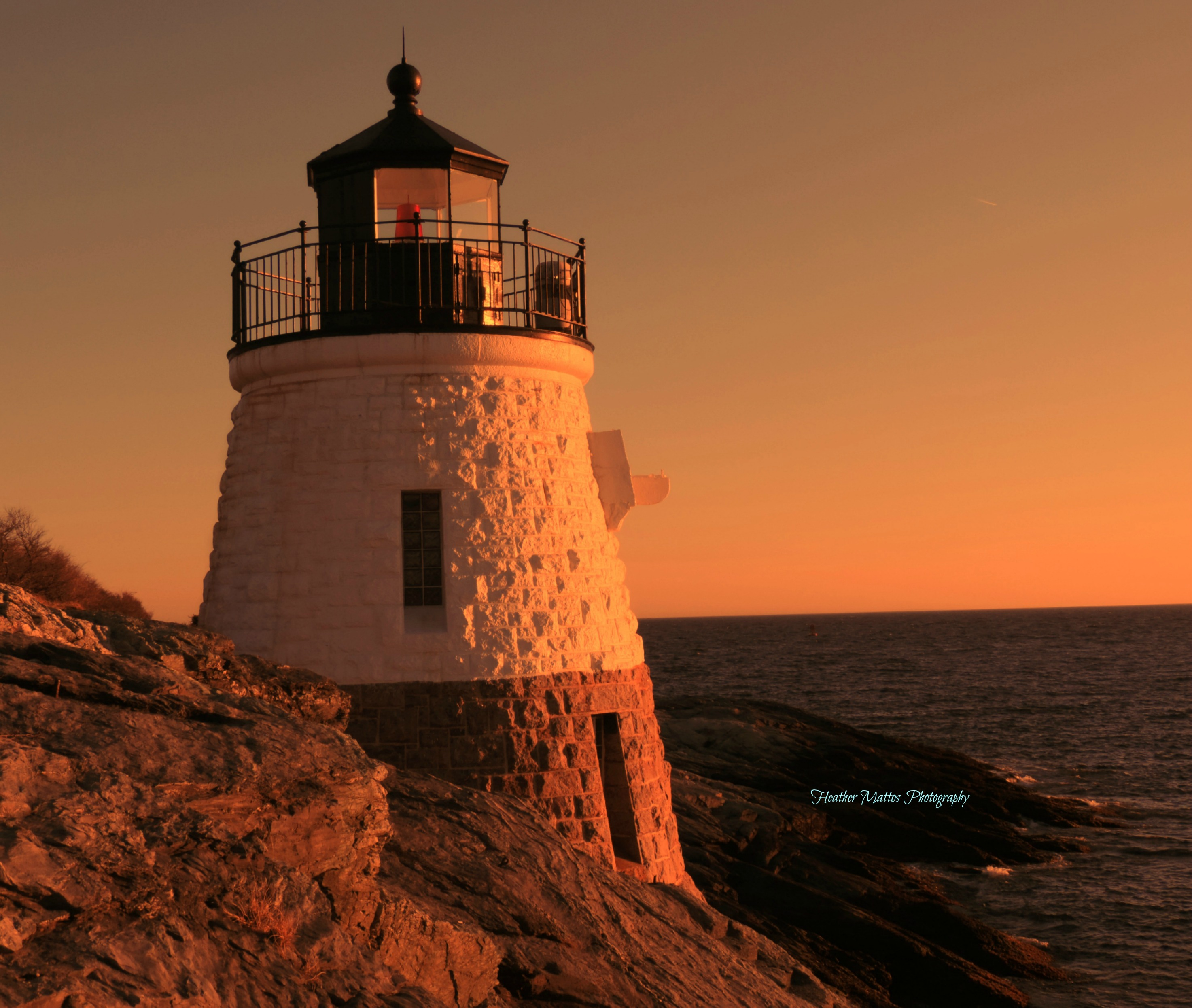

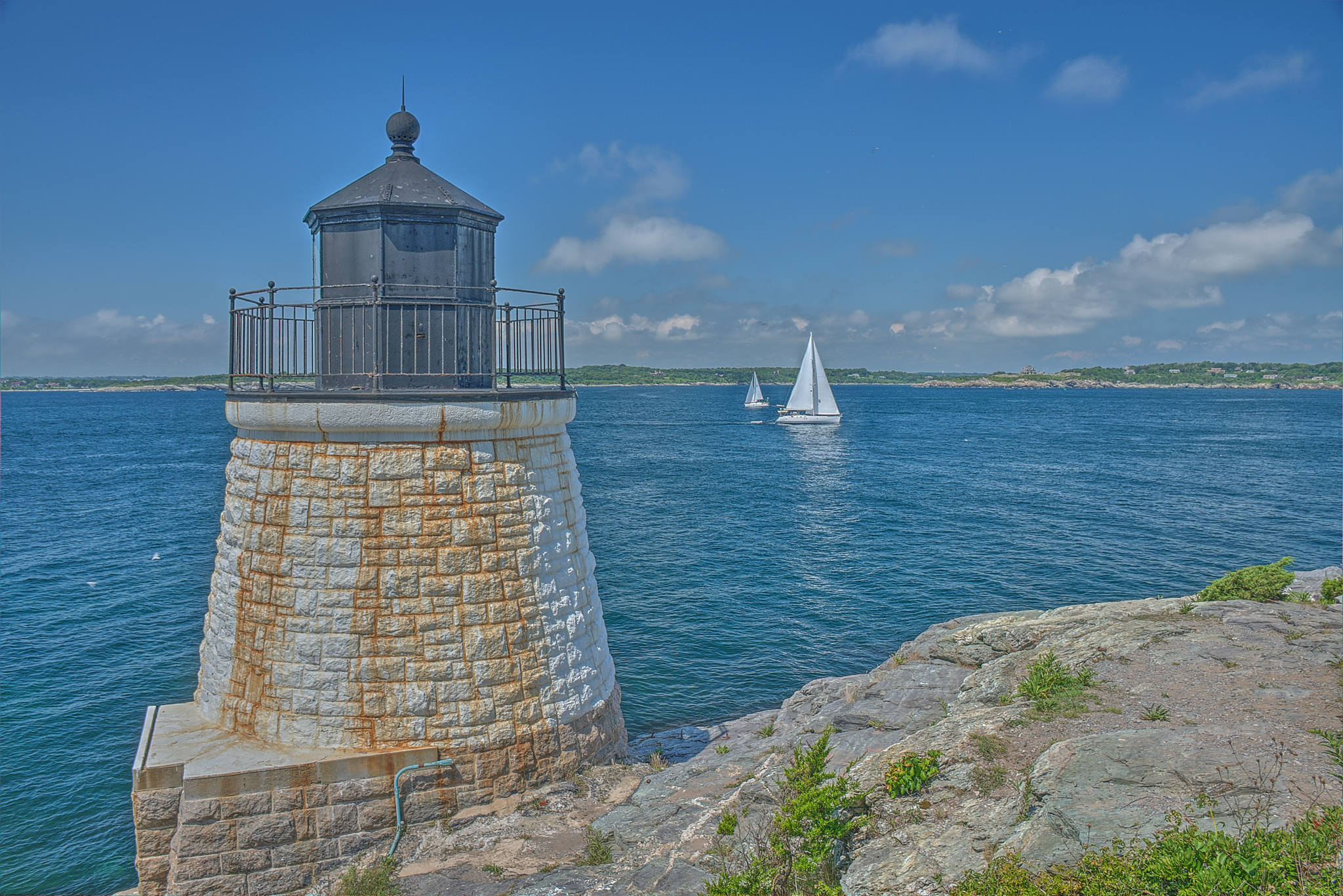

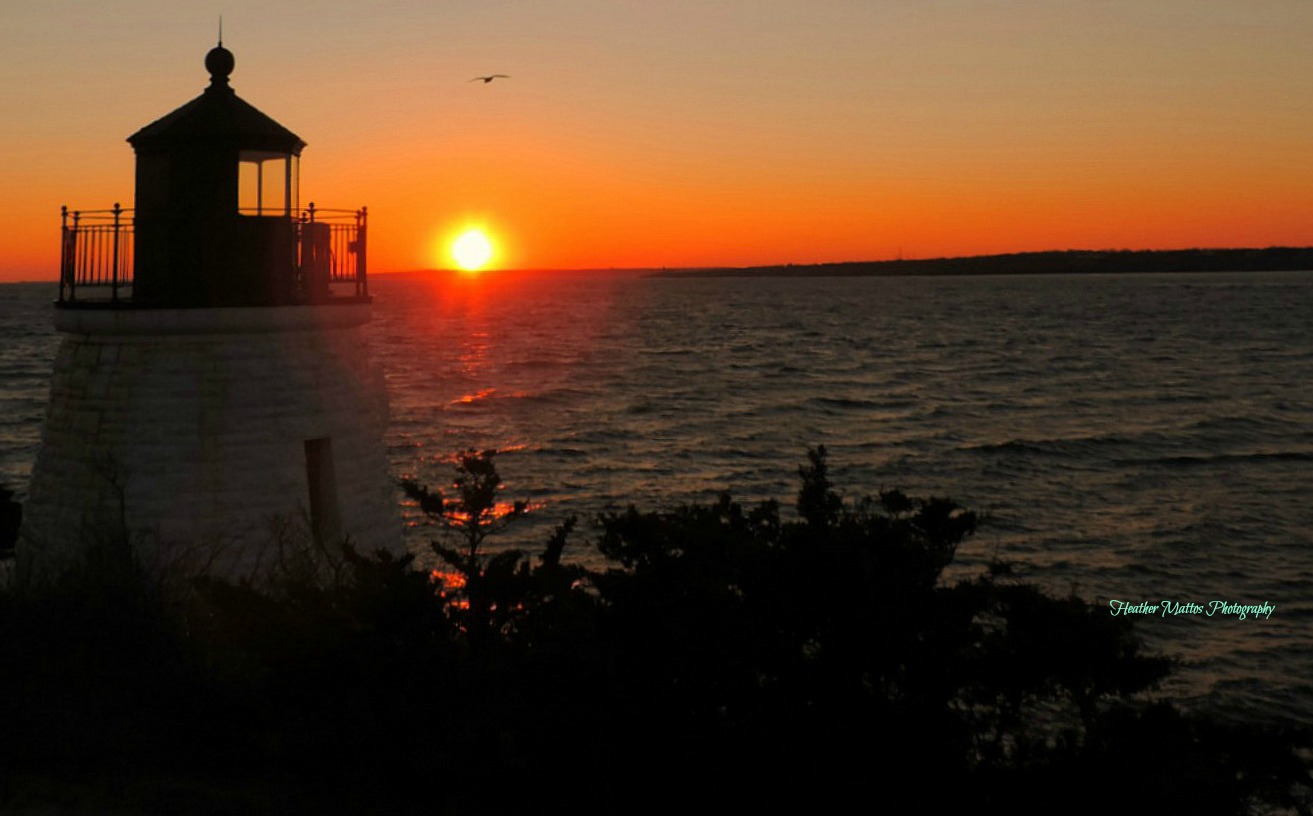

== List of keepers ==
1. Frank W. Parmele (1890 – 1911)
2. George L. Hoxsie (1911 – at least 1944)
3. Manuel Soares Macedo (at least 1945).
4. Ernest H. Stacey (Coast Guard BM1, May 22, 1947 – September 30, 1948)

After the 1938 hurricane, operation of the lighthouse was taken over by Coast Guard personnel. In 1957, the light was automated.

== See also ==
- National Register of Historic Places listings in Newport County, Rhode Island
