= Live at Berkeley (Nina Simone album) =

Live album by Nina Simone
- Released: 1973
- Recorded: April 26, 1969
- Venue: University of California, Berkeley
- Genre: Vocal, jazz, blues, folk
- Label: Stroud
- Producer: Jean-Luc Young

Nina Simone chronology
Sings Billie Holiday – Lady Sings the Blues (1972)	Live at Berkeley (1973)	Gospel According to Nina Simone (1973)

Live at Berkeley (also released as Nina Simone Live at Berkeley/Gifted & Black) is the tenth live album by jazz singer/pianist/songwriter Nina Simone. It was recorded at the University of California, Berkeley during the Third Annual Berkeley Jazz Festival in 1969. All arrangements were written by Simone, and it was produced by Jean-Luc Young.

The album has also been released combined with a previous Nina Simone LP from the early 1970s, Gifted & Black (1970), which was released on her then husband/producer Andrew Stroud's record label.

== Critical reception ==
Professional ratings
Review scores
Source	Rating
AllMusic	4/5 stars

In a review for AllMusic, Richard Mortifoglio commented on the 1970 album Live at Berkeley: " ... the Berkeley campus in the early '70s was such a hotbed of anti-Vietnam sentiment and the songs performed here, including "Ain't Got No/I Got Life" from HAIR, "Four Women," and the soon-to-be classic "To Be Young, Gifted & Black," partake of the political ferment that was in the air. They are not screeds, however; the band plays with a funky conga-propelled ease, and Simone is thoroughly in her element, relaxed and having fun as she gets her message across."

== Track listing ==
No.	Title	Length
1.	"Ain't Got No/I Got Life"	6:13
2.	"Four Women"	8:43
3.	"Backlash Blues/Dialogue"	5:27
4.	"No Opportunity Necessary, No Experience Needed"	4:42
5.	"The Assignment Song/Dialogue"	7:12
6.	"To Be Young, Gifted and Black"	4:14

== Personnel ==
- Nina Simone - Arranger
- F. Byron Clark - Engineer
- Monk Higgins - String Arrangements
- Jean-Luc Young - Executive Producer
