= Gooseberry Beach =

Beach in Newport, Rhode Island

Coordinates: 41°27′35.0″N 71°19′12.1″W

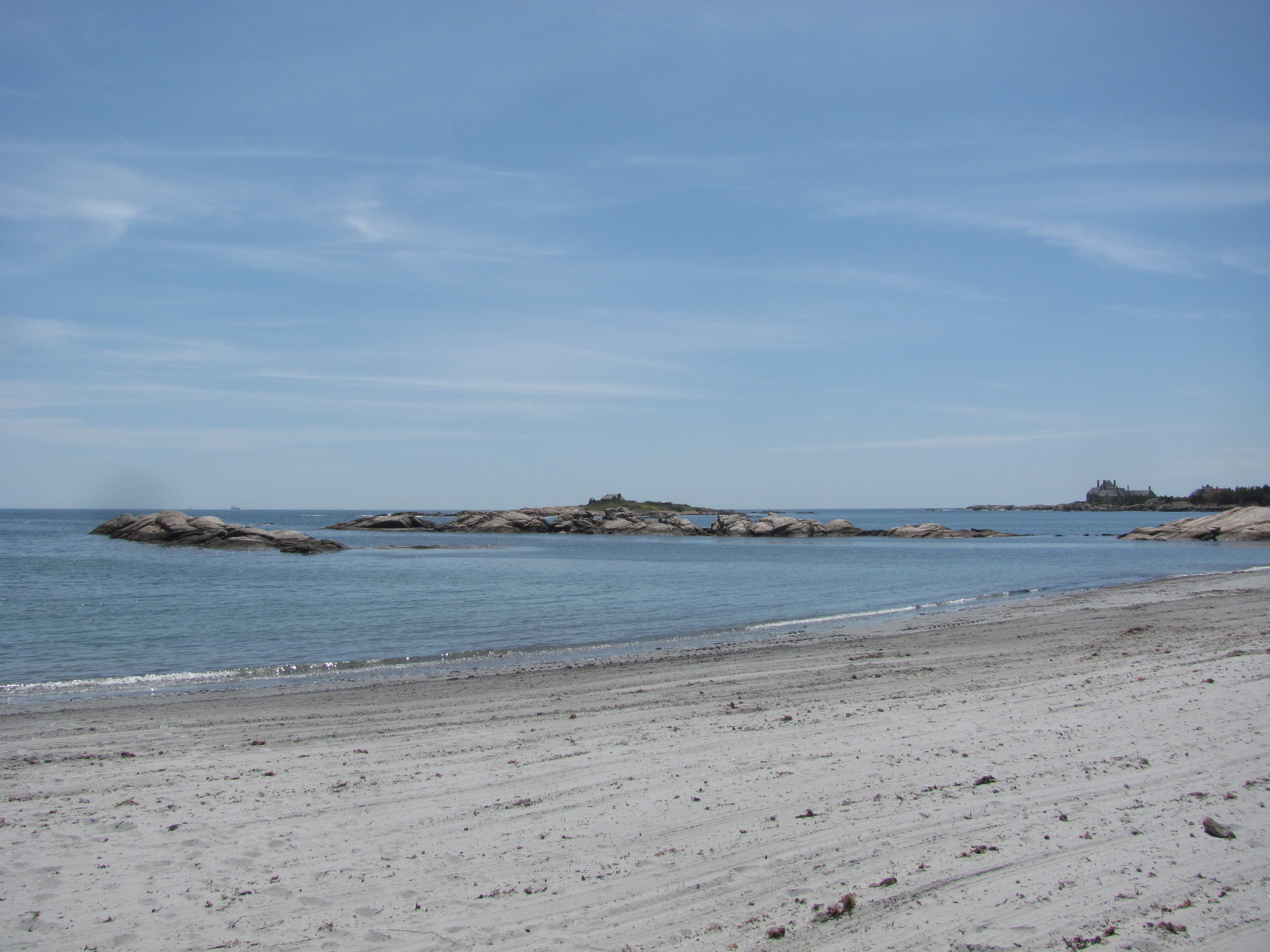
Gooseberry Beach

Gooseberry Beach is a beach located in Newport, Rhode Island off Ocean Drive. It is a private beach, but also open to the public. The beach is located between Bailey's Beach and Hazard's Beach.

Gooseberry itself is nestled in a sort of cove, protected by a spit of land and several large boulders roughly 75 metres offshore at high tide, no more than 50 at low tide.
