= Gifted & Black =

Studio album by Nina Simone
- Released: June 1970
- Recorded: 1957: original tracks; 1970: strings
- Studio: 1957: Unknown; 1970: RPM Studios, Los Angeles
- Genre: Vocal jazz, jazz, blues, soul and funk
- Length: 33:32
- Label: Canyon Records
- Producer: Stroud Productions and Enterprises

Gifted & Black is an unofficial studio album from jazz singer, pianist, and songwriter Nina Simone. It was originally released in 1970 by Canyon Records. However, it is thought to be a demo tape made by Simone in the spring of 1957 some months before the recording of Little Girl Blue, her first official album, in December of the same year. For the release in 1970, the original recording had strings added.

== Overview ==
Gifted & Black was probably released in July 1970, given the date of a contemporary review by Rolling Stone magazine, that of 6 August 1970. The reviewer points to what they see as problems with the release; the reviewer writes:

It's not that this album, ... is misrepresentative of what Nina is currently up to, and does a disservice to an exceptional artist's career. It's not that the strings, which are dubbed over her piano trio are in poor, nay, bad taste. It's not that it sounds as though the recording mikes were placed down the hall from the studio, in the toilet, perhaps.

Rather, it was just "this album is pisspoor". The reviewer took a guess, the album may have been "recorded around 1967(?)".

There are, however, no indications on the album sleeve or label of the year the tracks were recorded or the musicians playing in Simone's band (which might also place the date). Information the album does include is that it was released by the little known Canyon Records and Simone was signed to RCA at the time; and that Stroud Productions and Enterprises, Inc. were involved, a company set up by Simone's husband, Andy Stroud. During 1969 and 1970 their relationship broke down. As Nadine Cohodas writes [links added]:

On February 14 [1970] Amsterdam News columnist Jesse H. Walker reported in his Theatricals column (usually at least a week behind events) that the couple had separated [...] A front-page story in The Philadelphia Tribune February 21 announced that "Nina Simone Leaves Mate Who Earns $100,000 as Her Personal Manager".

Cohodas continues to state that "Andy had moved to a midtown Manhattan apartment". Simone eventually left the United States and went to Barbados in September 1970, leaving behind her wedding ring. They never reconciled and would eventually divorce.

Nonetheless, Stroud remained Simone's manager for some time thereafter, and was accordingly in control of her income, touring, and the mastertapes of her non-contracted recordings. Stroud went on to release a number of records after creating his own label in 1972. As Cohodas comments [links added]:

The first album he put out confirmed that Nina's music was the linchpin of the enterprise, Nina Simone Sings Billie Holiday - Lady Sings the Blues [1973]. Andy was no doubt hoping to capitalize on the recent movie about Holiday starring Diana Ross [called Lady Sings the Blues (1972)]. The album consisted of eight songs cobbled together from Nina's live performances and studio sessions, though there were no dates given nor or an explanation of how Andy had gotten the tracks. The cover featured a picture of Holiday - not Nina - and the music represented a Nina of the past.

Roger Nupie on The Nina Simone Database suggests something similar with Gifted & Black, that the tracks on the album may be Simone's earliest existing recordings: a demo tape recorded in early 1957, that had gone on to secure her first recording contract with Bethlehem Records later that year. The songs on the demo are both a similar selection and have a similar performance style to Simone's first album recorded soon after signing the contract with Bethlehem Records and eventually released as Little Girl Blue (1959). Nupie also suggests that Stroud added strings for the release of the album based on the demo, arranged by Monk Higgins, the only musician credited on the album sleeve. The title, similarly, capitalized on Simone's single of the previous year, "To Be Young, Gifted and Black" (1969).

While – like the Rolling Stone magazine reporter – taking the release date of the album at face value, Richard Mortifoglio for AllMusic considered Gifted & Black "something of a lost cabaret masterpiece", and it was as if Simone "was channeling the great cabaret artist Mabel Mercer, reminding us that apart from her deserved reputation as a socially significant African-American artist, Nina Simone was also an outstanding interpreter of the Great American Songbook."

== Track listing ==
No.	Title	Writer(s)	Length
1.	"Black Is the Color"	Nina Simone	3:06
2.	"Since My Love Is Gone"	Herbert Wasserman, Jack Aaron	3:57
3.	"Blue Prelude"	Gordon Jenkins, Joe Bishop	4:36
4.	"Spring Is Here"	Rodgers & Hart	4:19
5.	"Porgy"	DuBose Heyward, George & Ira Gershwin	3:59
6.	"Remind Me"	Dorothy Fields, Jerome Kern	3:41
7.	"Near to You"	Henry King - Carl Sigman	4:22
8.	"The Thrill Is Gone"	Lew Brown, Ray Henderson	5:32
Total length:			33:32

== Credit ==
- Nina Simone – Primary Artist
- Monk Higgins - Strings arrangement

== Reissue ==
In 2009, Gifted & Black was re-released along with another unofficial Simone album, Live at Berkeley (1973). The original release of Live at Berkeley also came from Stroud Productions, this time from Simone's husband's own label. The re-release was titled Gifted & Black / Live At Berkeley and was issued by Charly Records.
