= Spencer Odom =

Pianist-arranger (1913–1962)

- Spencer Odom (far right) and the Southernaires
- Born: Aug. 19, 1913; Chicago
- Died: December 24, 1962 (age 49); New York City
- Occupations: pianist, arranger
- Known for: work with the Southernaires and Frank Buck

Spencer Odom (born August 19, 1913, Chicago; died December 24, 1962 (age 49) New York City) was a pianist-arranger who conducted the music for the Frank Buck recording Tiger (record album).

== Early years ==
Odom was the son of Carrie Combs and Walter D. Odom. He received public musical education at Chicago Piano College, with private lessons under T. T. Taylor and Mrs. Estelle Bonds. His theory, arranging, composition and orchestral training were received under Major N. Clark Smith, who formed an orchestra from his best students including Ray Nance, Oliver Coleman, Claud Adams and Jesse Simpkins.

== Career ==
Odom was pianist and arranger for many well known bands, Dave Peyton and Lionel Hampton, and was the pianist for the popular Flying Home record. He also made arrangements for Vincent Lopez. He accompanied and arranged for the Southernaires and the Mariners with Arthur Godfrey.

== Work with Frank Buck ==
In 1950, Odom was arranger and conductor for the Frank Buck recording Tiger (record album).

== Death ==
Odom died of a heart attack Christmas Eve in his New York studio, the Showcase, while he and his associate, Bill Hyer, were rehearsing talent. A 15-minute break had been called and while Odom and his partner were talking, Odom suddenly slumped to the floor. Doctors were called but failed to revive him.
