= Remixed and Reimagined (Nina Simone album) =

Remix album by Nina Simone
- Released: 31 October 2006 (US)
- Genre: Electronic, house
- Length: 83:28
- Label: Legacy/RCA/SBMG Records; 88697 01280
- Producer: Scott Schlachter

Nina Simone chronology
The Very Best of Nina Simone (2006)	Remixed and Reimagined (2006)

Legacy Remixed Series chronology
Remixed and Reimagined (2006)	Remixed and Reimagined (Billie Holiday Album) (2007)

Professional ratings
Review scores
Source	Rating
AllMusic	4/5 stars
Okayplayer	3/5 stars

Remixed and Reimagined is the first album in the Legacy Remixed series released by Sony BMG. This is a collection of songs by Nina Simone, remixed by several Electronica artists. All original songs come from her albums released by RCA records. It was released in 2006 on Legacy/RCA/SBMG Records.

The Groovefinder remix of "Ain't Got No, I Got Life" reached number 30 in the UK and remained on the charts for 16 weeks. In Ireland it peaked at number 9 and remained on the charts for 15 weeks.

== Track listing ==
1. "I Can't See Nobody (Daniel Y. Remix)" – 3:06
2. "Funkier than a Mosquito's Tweeter (Jazzeem's All Styles Remix)" – 5:23
3. "Ain't Got No/I Got Life (Groovefinder Remix)" – 3:19
4. "Save Me (Coldcut Remix)" – 6:36
5. "Turn Me On (Tony Humphries Got U Turned On Dub)" – 7:58
6. "Here Comes the Sun (François K. Remix)" – 8:56
7. "Westwind (Organica Remix)" – 4:26
8. "Go to Hell (Mowo Remix)" – 4:33
9. "My Man's Gone Now (DJ Wally Remix)" – 4:05
10. "The Look of Love (Madison Park vs. Lenny B. Remix)" – 3:43
11. "O-o-h, Child (Nickodemus Remix)" – 3:32
12. "To Love Somebody (Chris Coco's Stadium Rocker Remix)" – 5:39
13. "Obeah Woman (DJ Logic Remix)" – 4:57
14. "I Wish I Knew How It Would Feel To Be Free (Ralphi Rosario & Craig J. Rival Vox Remix)" - 3:50 (UK bonus track)
15. "Turn Me On (Tony Humphries’s Full Vocal Mix)" – 8:40 (only available at iTunes)
16. "O-o-h, Child (Nickodemus’s Shufflin’ Only Mix)" – 3:32 (only available at iTunes)
17. "Obeah Woman (DJ Logic’s Instru-Jammin’ Mix)" – 4:56 (only available at iTunes)

== Charts ==
Chart (2006)	Peak position
US Jazz Albums	11
US Dance/Electronic Albums	9
