= Remind Me (Dorothy Fields and Jerome Kern song) =

Single by Leo Reisman and His Orchestra
- A-side: "Your Dream"
- Written: 1936
- Released: 1940
- Recorded: November 4, 1940
- Genre: Traditional pop
- Label: RCA Victor
- Composer: Jerome Kern
- Lyricist: Dorothy Fields

"Remind Me" is a 1940 song composed by Jerome Kern, with lyrics written by Dorothy Fields.

It was written in 1936 for the unproduced Universal film "Riviera", which was based on the Earl Derr Biggers novel "Love Insurance." Years later the novel was re-adapted for the film One Night in the Tropics (1940), and the same Kern and Fields score was used. The film was widely regarded as a flop, although it marked the movie debut of Abbott and Costello. The song was virtually thrown away in an early scene as it was introduced by Peggy Moran (who was dubbed by an unknown singer). Only one commercial recording in 1940 can be traced and that was the one by Leo Reisman and his Orchestra (Victor 27237). It was not a hit. The song was revived in the late 1940s by Mabel Mercer who used it in her nightclub act and it has subsequently been included by a number of prominent singers in their albums.

The song was included in the 1986 Broadway musical revue "Jerome Kern Goes to Hollywood". It was also used in the stage musical Never Gonna Dance which opened on Broadway in 2003 when it was sung by Nancy Lemenager and Noah Racey.

== Notable recordings ==
- Tony Bennett – for his album With Love (1972)
- June Christy - Off-Beat (1960); The Jazz Sessions: The Best of June Christy (1997)
- Doris Day and André Previn - Duet (1962)
- Ella Fitzgerald - Ella Fitzgerald Sings the Jerome Kern Songbook (1963)
- Peggy Lee - for her album Pretty Eyes (1960)
- Julie London - for her album Sophisticated Lady (1962)
- Nina Simone - Gifted & Black (1970).
