= Remixed and Reimagined (Billie Holiday album) =

Remix album by Billie Holiday
- Released: August 7, 2007
- Genre: Electronica, lounge, house, broken beat
- Length: 67:12
- Label: Legacy/Columbia/SBMG Records; 82876 85088
- Producer: Steven Berkowitz; Scott Schlachter

Series chronology
Remixed and Reimagined (Nina Simone album) (2006)	Remixed and Reimagined (2007)

Professional ratings
Review scores
Source	Rating
AllMusic	3/5 stars
PopMatters	7/10

Remixed and Reimagined is the second entry in Sony BMG's Legacy Remixed series. It features Billie Holiday recordings culled from her years on Columbia Records.

== Track listing ==
1. "I Hear Music" (Swingsett & Takuya's Mighty Fine Remix)—5:10
2. "More than You Know" (Jazzeem's Throwback Remix)—5:11
3. "Spreadin' Rhythm Around" (Lady Bug vs. Lady Day RR Remix)—4:00
4. "Long-Gone Blues" (GXR Remix)—5:03
5. "Trav'lin' All Alone" (Nickodemus & Zeb Remix)—3:48
6. "He Ain't Got Rhythm" (Poppyseed Remix)—4:16
7. "Summertime" (Organica Remix)—4:28
8. "I'm Gonna Lock My Heart (And Throw Away the Key)" (Madison Park Remix)—4:35
9. "Glad to Be Unhappy" (DJ Logic Remix)—4:26
10. "Billie's Blues" (Daniel Y. Remix)—3:11
11. "You're So Desirable" (Sunday People Remix)—5:31
12. "Pennies from Heaven" (Count de Money Remix)—3:47
13. "But Beautiful" (Tony Humphries THP Remix)—8:41
14. "All of Me" (Charles Feelgood Remix)—4:48
