= Tiger (Frank Buck album) =

Children's record

Tiger narrated by Frank Buck; Champion: The Horse No Man Could Ride narrated by Gene Autry

Studio album by Frank Buck, Gene Autry
- Released: April 17, 1950
- Genre: Drama
- Label: Columbia JL 8012

Tiger, a children’s record, was Frank Buck’s last recorded performance. The story was adapted by "Peter Steele" and Hecky Krasnow. In fact, Krasnow often wrote under two names, Peter Steele and Hecky Krasno, dropping the "w." In Tiger Krasnow combined two animals from two stories in Bring 'Em Back Alive:

- The first is the tiger from the story “Man Eater,” which has been changed to a cow killer;
- The second is the leopard from “Loose on Board,” which has been changed into a tiger.

Merrill Joels, a radio actor, is the narrator, Captain Harry Curtis. Vocals are by the Southernaires, orchestra conducted by Spencer Odom. Buck was mortally ill with lung cancer as he read his lines, and was dead when Columbia Records issued the album, April 17, 1950. Yet he sounds remarkably fit, and the recording itself has the charm of an old-time radio show, complete with music, sound effects, and an actor growling like a tiger. Columbia released the recording as a part of its children's series of 10” records (JL 8001 to JL 8013, 1949–1950). The second part of the album consists of Gene Autry narrating Champion: The Horse No Man Could Ride.
