= A Single Woman (album) =

Studio album by Nina Simone
- Released: March 1993
- Recorded: August–December 1992
- Venue: Hollywood, Los Angeles, California
- Studios: Oceanway Studios, Mad Hatter Studio
- Genres: Vocal; soul; jazz; pop
- Length: 39:06
- Label: Elektra
- Producer: André Fischer

Nina Simone chronology
Live at Ronnie Scott's (1987)	A Single Woman (1993)	The Soul of Nina Simone (2005)

Professional ratings
Review scores
Source	Rating
AllMusic	3/5 stars
Christgau's Consumer Guide	(dud)
The Encyclopedia of Popular Music	3/5 stars
Music Week	2/5 stars
New York Daily News	4/5 stars
The Observer	3/5 stars
Rolling Stone	2/5 stars

A Single Woman is the final studio album by the singer Nina Simone, released in 1993 via Elektra Records.

In November of 2025, Omnivore Records released A Single Woman: The Complete Elektra Recordings- a double-album featuring the complete collection of material that Simone recorded during those sessions. It features covers of Bob Dylan, Prince, The Beatles, and Bob Marley, originally intended for a follow-up album that never happened.

== Critical reception ==
The Times wrote: "Despite the strings, the woodwinds, the French accordions or the 'My Way' overtones of many of these songs, [Simone] speaks with bleak honesty and unashamed recalcitrance to many people who value such qualities above sham professionalism or artifice."

Reviewing a reissue, Clash wrote that Simone's "voice is richer and deeper; her phrasing resembles more than ever the tender voicing of a jazz trumpet."

== Track listing ==
No.	Title	Writer(s)	Length
1.	"A Single Woman"	Rod McKuen	3:33
2.	"Lonesome Cities"	Rod McKuen	3:08
3.	"If I Should Lose You"	Ralph Rainger, Leo Robin	3:59
4.	"The Folks Who Live on the Hill"	Oscar Hammerstein II, Jerome Kern	3:39
5.	"Love's Been Good to Me"	Rod McKuen	3:57
6.	"Papa, Can You Hear Me?"	Alan Bergman, Marilyn Bergman, Michel Legrand	4:22
7.	"Il n'y a pas d'amour heureux"	Louis Aragon, Georges Brassens	6:26
8.	"Just Say I Love Him"	Jimmy Dale, Martin Kalmanoff, Jack Val, Sam Ward	4:29
9.	"The More I See You"	Mack Gordon, Harry Warren	2:42
10.	"Marry Me"	Nina Simone	2:51

Expanded version (2008)
No.	Title	Writer(s)	Length
11.	"The Long and Winding Road"	John Lennon, Paul McCartney	3:32
12.	"I'm Gonna Sit Right Down and Write Myself a Letter"	Fred E. Ahlert, Joe Young	2:30
13.	"Baseball Boogie"	Nina Simone	0:55
14.	"No Woman, No Cry"	Bob Marley	3:13
15.	"Do I Move You"	Nina Simone	3:16
16.	"The Times They Are a-Changin'"	Bob Dylan	0:56
17.	"Sign o' the Times"	Prince	5:37

== Personnel ==
- Nina Simone – vocals, piano
- John Chiodini, Al Schackman – guitar
- John Clayton, Steve Edelman, Christopher Hanulik, Jim Hughart, Buell Neidlinger, John Peña, Susan Ranney, Margaret Storer, David Young – bass guitar
- Mike Melvoin – piano
- Andre Fischer, Jeff Hamilton, Paul Robinson – drums
- Larry Bunker, Darryl Munyungo Jackson, Bill Summers – percussion
- Gerald Albright – tenor saxophone
- Jack Sheldon – trumpet
- Frank Marocco – accordion
- Ann Stockton, Carol Robbins – harp
- Assa Drori, Connie Kupka, Gina Kronstadt, Gordon Marron, Henry Ferber, Irving Geller, Isabelle Daskoff, Israel Baker, Jay Rosen, Joel Derouin, Kathleen Lenski, Mari Tsumura, Mark Cargill, Shari Zippert, Yvette Devereaux – violin
- Evan Wilson, Herschel Wise, Margot MacLaine, Marilyn Baker, Rollice Dale – viola
- David Speltz, Frederick Seykora, Igor Horoshevsky, Marie Fera, Melissa Hasin, Suzie Katayama – cello
- Bob Tricarico, Earl Dumler, Gary Foster, Jack Nimitz, Jeff Clayton, Jon Kip, Valerie King – woodwind, reeds
- Brad Warnaar, Jeff DeRosa, Marilyn Johnson, Richard Todd – French horn
- Gerald Vinci – concertmaster, violin
- Jeremy Lubbock, John Clayton, Richard Evans, Nina Simone, Andre Fischer – arrangements

Technical

- Andre Fischer – Producer
- Al Schmitt – mixing, recording
- Michael Alago – executive producer
- Carol Friedman – photography

== Charts ==
Chart (1993)	Peak position
US Jazz Albums	19
