= Ocean Drive Historic District =

Historic district in Rhode Island, United States

- U.S. National Register of Historic Places
- U.S. National Historic Landmark District
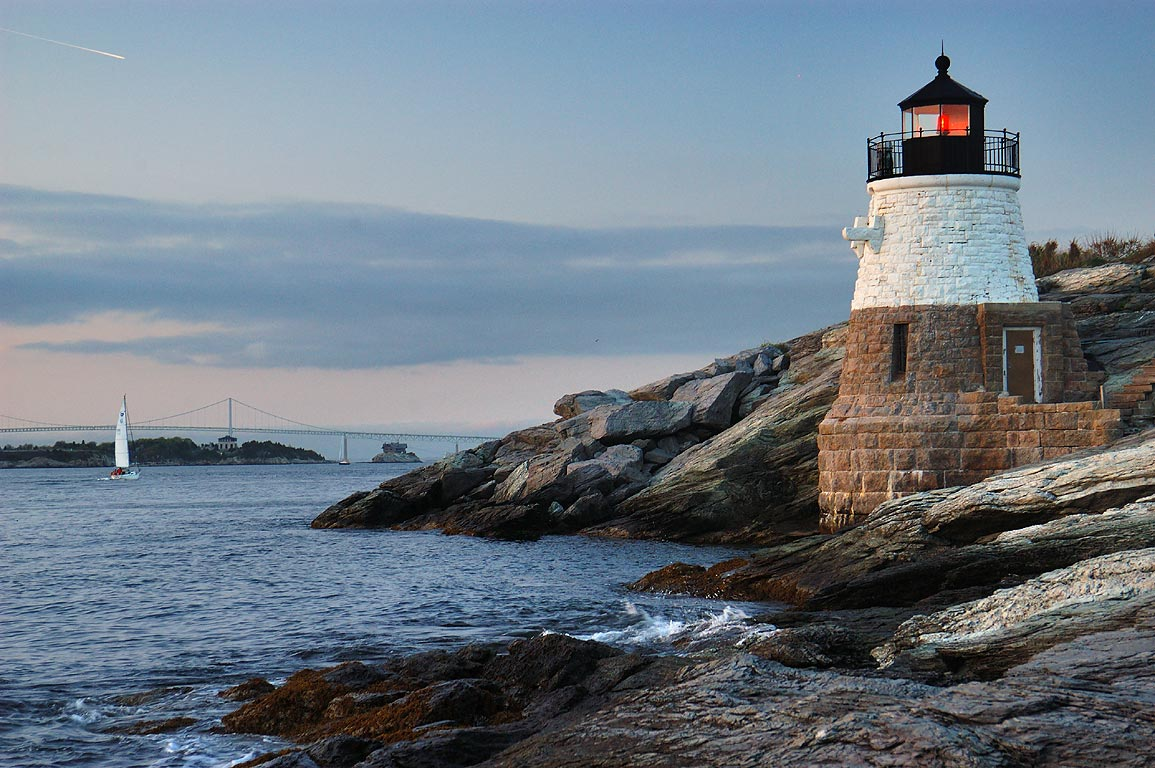
- View of Castle Hill Light, located at the end of the Ocean Drive

- Location within Rhode Island Location within the United States
- Location: Newport, RI
- Coordinates: 41°27′18″N 71°19′57″W
- Area: 1,509 acres (611 ha)
- Built: Late 18th-20th century
- Architectural style: Late Victorian, early 20th-century revival styles
- NRHP reference No.: 76000048

Significant dates
- Added to NRHP: May 11, 1976
- Designated NHLD: May 11, 1976

The Ocean Drive Historic District is a historic district that covers the long avenue of the same name along the southern shore of Newport, Rhode Island, United States. The majority of the land was owned by Edward King. It was designated a National Historic Landmark District in 1976, in recognition for its distinctive landscape (largely the work of Frederick Law Olmsted) and architecture, which is less formal and generally not as ostentatious as the grand summer properties of Bellevue Avenue.

Olmstead completed the design of Ocean Drive in 1867. It consists of houses on large lots that overlook the beaches and ocean. It was a favorite picnicking spot of the wealthy summer residents of the mansions on nearby Bellevue Avenue in the late 19th and early 20th centuries.

== Geography ==
Ocean Drive begins at an intersection with Ocean Avenue, a short distance from the southern terminus of Bellevue. It follows the shoreline closely in a roughly east–west direction, meandering as it does, to Brenton Point State Park on Aquidneck Island's southwestern corner, the only place it turns away from the shoreline. It then continues along the shore again, with views toward Conanicut Island, before it ends just south of Fort Adams.

The topography along the road consists mainly of dunes and low hills, on which houses were built in a variety of late 19th and 20th century styles. The hills are mostly open, with occasional patches of scrubby bush and copses of trees. Land use is almost exclusively residential. Of the 53 buildings within the district, the few commercial structures are the clubhouses of private beaches and associated outbuildings (one, Gooseberry Beach, is open to the public). Unlike Newport's other historic districts, none of them are separately listed on the National Register of Historic Places.

== History ==
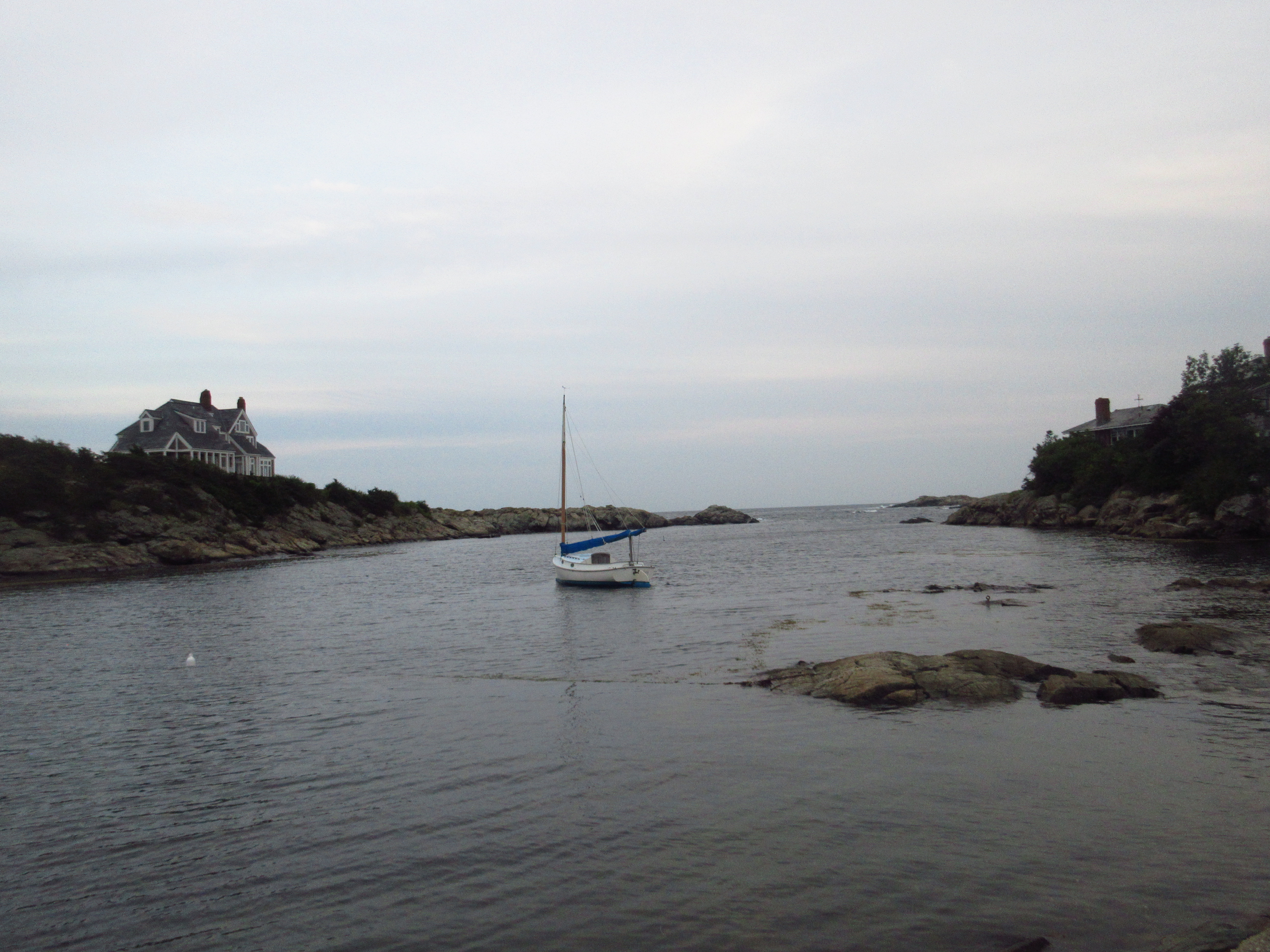
Scenic view along the drive.

The Ocean Drive area was once farmland, distant from the center of town during the colonial era. The expansion of the city's development along Bellevue Avenue as the wealthy summer residents built grander and grander mansions eventually opened up the Ocean Drive area to development; however smaller houses were built due to the more rolling landscape. The area thus retains some of the character it originally had.

== Historic District Commission ==
To maintain the district's historic character, the city created its Historic District Commission (HDC) at the same time as the district itself. It consists of nine citizens appointed to three-year terms by the City Council to oversee not just the downtown historic district but Newport's other historic districts, two of which (downtown and Bellevue Avenue) are also recognized as National Historic Landmarks. The city considers them all one large district for its administrative purposes.

The HDC must review any exterior alterations to a building in the district beyond ordinary maintenance and repair, and issue a Certificate of Appropriateness. It cannot order any changes made to a property.

== See also ==
- List of National Historic Landmarks in Rhode Island
- National Register of Historic Places listings in Newport County, Rhode Island
