= Hecky Krasnow =

American songwriter (1910–1984)

- Born: Herman Krasnow; February 15, 1910; Hartford, Connecticut
- Died: April 23, 1984 (aged 74); Miami, Florida
- Other names: Hecky Krasno
- Occupations: violinist, record producer
- Known for: work with Gene Autry ("Rudolph the Red-Nosed Reindeer") and Frank Buck
- Spouse: Lillian Drucker Krasnow

Herman "Hecky" Krasnow, sometimes given as Hecky Krasno, (February 15, 1910 – April 23, 1984) was a record producer of "Rudolph the Red-Nosed Reindeer", "Frosty the Snowman", and the Frank Buck recording Tiger.

== Early years ==
Krasnow was born in Hartford, Connecticut, son of Harry Krasnow, founder of the National Iron Works (later National Steel Products), and Sarah Wohl Krasnow. Hecky Krasnow studied violin at the Juilliard School under Leopold Auer. He was a talented violinist, highly praised for the range of his repertoire.

== Record producer ==
Krasnow was a producer for Columbia Records from 1949 to 1956, when he became a free-lance writer and producer. His compositions included "Rendezvous d'Amour", "I Just Can't Wait 'Til Christmas" and "The Happy Cobbler". He was the producer of the Columbia recordings of "Rudolph the Red-Nosed Reindeer" and "Frosty the Snowman", sung by Gene Autry; the songs of Burl Ives and Captain Kangaroo, "The Ballad of Davy Crockett" and "Smokey the Bear". He also produced "I'm Gettin' Nuttin' for Christmas" and "I Saw Mommy Kissing Santa Claus". Krasnow worked with Gene Kelly, Jackie Robinson, Rosemary Clooney ("Come On-a My House"), Dinah Shore, Nina Simone, Art Carney, Jose Ferrer, and Arthur Godfrey. He also produced the first LP by the Chad Mitchell Trio on Colpix (At New York City's Blue Angel club, he is listed as producer on the LP back cover).

== Work with Frank Buck ==
In 1950, Krasnow wrote and produced the Frank Buck recording Tiger.

== Later years ==
Krasnow died aged 74 in Miami, Florida.

== Biography ==
Krasnow's daughter, Judy Gail Krasnow, has written a biography of her father.
