= My Baby Just Cares for Me =

1930 song by Walter Donaldson and Gus Kahn

Song
- Published: 1930 by Donaldson, Douglas & Gumble
- Songwriter: Gus Kahn
- Composer: Walter Donaldson

"My Baby Just Cares for Me" is a jazz standard written by Walter Donaldson with lyrics by Gus Kahn. Written for the film version of the musical comedy Whoopee! (1930), the song became a signature tune for Eddie Cantor who sang it in the movie. A stylized version of the song by American singer and songwriter Nina Simone, recorded in 1957, was a top 10 hit in the United Kingdom after it was used in a 1987 perfume commercial and resulted in a renaissance for Simone.

== Recordings ==
- Ted Weems, (vocal by Art Jarrett) – this reached the charts of the day in 1930
- Jack Payne (1930)
- Isham Jones (1930)
- Billy "Uke" Carpenter (1930)
- Harry James (1946)
- Nat King Cole (1949)
- Mel Tormé
- Dean Martin (1952)
- The Hi-Lo's – this briefly reached the Billboard charts in 1954.
- Tony Bennett (1955)
- Somethin' Smith and the Redheads (1955)
- Bing Crosby (1956) for use on his radio show and it was subsequently included in the box set The Bing Crosby CBS Radio Recordings (1954–56) issued by Mosaic Records (catalog MD7-245) in 2009.
- Jane Powell (1957)
- Frankie Lymon & The Teenagers (1957)
- Gene Kelly (1957)
- Nina Simone (1957), reissued in 1985, and after re-entering the UK charts in 1987 it hit #5 (UK)
- Tommy Dorsey (1958)
- Pat Boone (1958)
- Marlene Dietrich (1961)
- Count Basie (vocalist Joe Williams) (1962)
- Al Hirt and Ann-Margret (1963)
- Vic Damone (1963)
- Mary Wells (1964)
- Julie London (1964)
- Frank Sinatra (1966)
- Cornell Campbell (1975)
- Frighty & Colonel Mite (1990)
- The Temperance Seven "The Writing On The Wall" album (1992)
- Edward Norton (1996) in the musical film Everyone Says I Love You
- Alex Chilton (1997)
- Indigo Swing (1998)
- George Michael (1999)
- Katharine Whalen's Jazz Squad (1999)
- Natalie Cole (2002)
- Cyndi Lauper (2003)
- Sophie Milman (2004)
- Delicatessen (2009)
- Renee Olstead (2009)
- Florence Welch and Jools (2009)
- Jimmy Barnes (2010)
- Andrea Motis and Joan Chamorro (2011)
- Ana Cañas (2012)
- Aga Zaryan (2013)
- Harmony Keeney (2014)
- Usher (2015)
- Katie Noonan (2015)
- Michael Bublé (2016)
- Haley Reinhart (2018)
- Jan Rot (2020, sung in Dutch)

== Nina Simone recording ==
"My Baby Just Cares for Me"
- Cover of Nina Simone's 1987 single release

Single by Nina Simone

from the album Little Girl Blue
- B-side: "He Needs Me"
- Released: 1962
- Recorded: 1957
- Genre: Jazz
- Length: 3:20
- Label: Bethlehem
- Songwriters: Walter Donaldson, Gus Kahn

Simone recorded the song in late 1957 for her debut album, Little Girl Blue, released in February 1959. The track remained relatively obscure until 1987, when it was used in a UK television commercial for Chanel No. 5 perfume. To follow up this exposure, the track was released as a single by Charly Records, entering the UK Singles Chart on October 31, 1987 and becoming, after a peak at number 5, one of Simone's biggest hits some 18 years after her previous chart entry. This single also made the top 10 in several European single charts and peaked at number one in the Dutch Top 40.

The Simone version of the song was featured on the soundtrack for the 1992 film Peter's Friends, the 1994 film Shallow Grave, and the 1996 film Stealing Beauty.

=== Music video ===
In 1987 a claymation music video was produced for "My Baby Just Cares for Me" by Aardman Animations and directed by Peter Lord. The video prominently features live action footage showing details of a piano, brushes on a snare drum, and a double bass as they play the song. The two focal characters are represented by a singing cat in a club and the cat who is in love with her.

=== Charts ===
Chart (1987–1988)	Peak position
Australia (Kent Music Report)	36
Austria (Ö3 Austria Top 40)	8
Belgium (Ultratop Flanders)	2
Finland (Suomen virallinen lista)	16
France (SNEP)	9
Netherlands (Dutch Top 40)	1
Netherlands (Single Top 100)	2
Switzerland (Schweizer Hitparade)	5
UK Singles (OCC)	5
West Germany (Official German Charts)	11

=== Certifications ===
Region	Certification	Certified units/sales
Italy (FIMI)	Gold	50,000^{‡}
New Zealand (RMNZ)	Gold	15,000^{‡}
Spain (Promusicae) 2013 Remastered Version	Gold	30,000^{‡}
United Kingdom (BPI) Physical sales in 1987–88	Silver	250,000^{^}
United Kingdom (BPI) Digital sales + streams since 2008	Gold	400,000^{‡}
^{^} Shipments figures based on certification alone.^{‡} Sales+streaming figures based on certification alone.
