= Madison Park (duo) =

American electronica duo

- Origin: United States
- Genres: Pop, Electro dance
- Years active: 2002–present
- Members: James Cool; DeAnna Cool

Madison Park is an American electronica duo composed of husband and wife James and DeAnna Cool.

== Band history ==
Madison Park released some of their first tracks on the first two volumes of New Sound Theory, a pair of chill-out compilations released in 2003 through basicLUX Records, the record label they had founded in 2002. When their track “My Personal Moon,” from Volume 1, hit the Billboard Dance Singles Sales chart, they decided to release a full-length album, titled Boutique. The album was released on March 23, 2004. "Ocean Drive", the album's lead single, entered the Billboard Hot Dance Club Play chart (since renamed the Dance Club Songs chart) as the Hot Shot Debut on the chart dated October 2, 2004. It eventually peaked at number 12, spending a total of 12 weeks on the chart. The song remains their highest-peaking chart entry. In 2005, their remake of Roxy Music's "More Than This" also peaked within Billboard's Dance Club Songs top 30. In 2006, “I’m Listening”, a single from their sophomore album, In the Stars, also charted on the Dance Club Songs chart, peaking at number 25.

In 2007 Madison Park produced remixes for Sony Legacy's Remixed and Reimagined series. The first album in the Legacy Remixed series was released by Sony BMG. The collection was composed of Nina Simone classics and included remixes by Coldcut, Francios K, Chris Coco and Tony Humphries. Madison Park teamed up with Lenny B to rework “The Look of Love” that ultimately found its way onto the Sex And The City soundtrack in 2008. It also appeared in the Sex And The City film, also 2008. The next remix Madison Park produced for Sony Legacy was Billie Holiday's “I’m Gonna Lock My Heart” also released by Sony BMG. Their trip-hop version of the track was initially placed on“Billie Holidays: Remixed and Reimagined”. The Madison Park remix also appeared in an episode of Nip/Tuck in 2007.

In 2008, Madison Park released a third album, “Another Yesterday”. Two solid dance radio hits came from the album including title track “Another Yesterday” and “Come Out And Play”, a co-production with Swiss producer, Monodeluxe (alias Alessandro Oliviero). Since the release of the album Another Yesterday, Madison Park has released a score of maxi-singles such as “I Stumble Fall”, “Fascinated”, and “Sunrise”. Each title faring well amongst house music DJ's, club play and dance radio.

In late 2011 “Sunrise” a collaboration with Amsterdam-based producer, Beechkraft, appeared in the Top 10 in 18 US-based record pools and various terrestrial, satellite, and internet radio programs. “Sunrise” –Round Two is set for digital release on July 10, 2012.

Additional: Often quoted as saying that the band Roxy Music has served as a major musical influence, this was well-proven when the duo created Roxy Remodeled, a compilation CD of 13 reworked Roxy classics in their signature downtempo, house music vein. Distributed through Tommyboy Records, the CD was a well-liked selection of Elton John's as he reportedly purchased multiple copies from an Atlanta Tower Records on separate occasions. Madison Park's version of “More Than This”, a Billboard charter for the duo, was co-produced with US producer, Lenny B. The couple also reworked Same Old Scene with Soul Rider of Hallucination Recordings.

Upon release of the New Sound Theory series executive-produced by the pair, local DJ's participated in “New Sound Sundays” held weekly at Halo Lounge in Atlanta, hosted by their record label basicLUX Records.

Madison Park participated in several music placement programs to help broaden their fan-base such as Dell Computer and Apple's iPod in 2006 and 2007.

Both vegetarian, as well as co-producer of vegan, travel creamer SoyGo, Madison Park produced the video “Opus One” regarding the plight of animals raised for food in factory farms in 2007. In 2008 a version with French-subtitles was created and can be found on YouTube.

In 2012 Madison Park signed with Toco International on current single “Sunrise” -collaboration with Amsterdam-based producer, Beechkraft.

Currently producing the fifth volume of New Sound Theory, the duo is also working on new Madison Park material for a fourth album.

== Discography ==
=== Albums ===
==== Boutique (2004) ====
1. Nu Sensation
2. Ocean Drive
3. Sense & Sensibility
4. You Do Something To Me
5. Boutique
6. My Personal Moon (Lenny B's Disco-house mix)
7. Who's Got the Time
8. Free
9. You Take Me Places
10. Walking Down The Street
11. Give Me Your Love
12. Opus One
13. I Can Change Your Mind (vocal house mix)
14. My Personal Moon (NST mix)

==== In The Stars (2006) ====
1. All About The Groove
2. Dancing Away All My Time
3. In The Stars
4. When Alive Is Alive
5. I'm Listening
6. Love Solution
7. Right Around Here
8. Other Way Around
9. More Than This
10. Breathe
11. One Day
12. Ocean Drive (Lenny B's Club Mix)

===== Another Yesterday (2008) =====
1. Another Yesterday
2. Just As the Sun
3. Miles Away
4. Numbing Down to Nothing
5. Slowly
6. Come Out And Play
7. Something's Missing
8. More Than This (The Sidewalk Mix)
9. I See Your Face
10. Put Your Problems On Me
11. Wish You Were Here
12. I Don't Want to Know
13. Your Touch
14. Another Yesterday (Slow It Down Mix)

=== Singles and Extended Plays ===
- My Personal Moon
- Ocean Drive
- More Than This
- I'm Listening
- One Day
- All About The Groove (round one)
- All About The Groove (round two)
- In A Trance
- Come Out And Play
- Another Yesterday
- I Stumble, Fall
- Fascination
- Sunrise
