= Little Girl Blue (album) =

1959 debut studio album by Nina Simone

Studio album by Nina Simone
- Released: February 1959
- Recorded: Late 1957
- Studio: Beltone, New York City
- Genre: Jazz, gospel
- Length: 45:27
- Label: Bethlehem

Nina Simone chronology
Little Girl Blue (1959)	The Amazing Nina Simone (1959)

Little Girl Blue: Jazz as Played in an Exclusive Side Street Club is the debut album by the jazz pianist and singer Nina Simone. It was released by Bethlehem Records in February 1959. It was recorded in late 1957 but its release was held up by the label. Due to the delay and the lack of any promotional single either immediately before or alongside the album, Simone was dissatisfied with Bethlehem and signed with Colpix Records in April 1959. She recorded the tracks for her second album – what would become The Amazing Nina Simone – the same month. In May, however, Bethlehem finally released a single, "I Loves You, Porgy", and gave Simone her first hit later that year, peaking at number 18 on the pop charts, and number 2 on the R&B charts. Helped by the profile of the single, the album too went on to become a chart success.

In 1987, the track "My Baby Just Cares for Me" became a massive UK and European hit. The album was reissued, now with the title of single and with a new cover, and the tracks in a different order. This release eventually became the subject of a legal dispute. Later releases of the album include bonus tracks from the same recording session.

== Overview ==
=== Recording ===
In spring 1957, while playing gigs in Philadelphia, Simone recorded a demo (which is believed to be the basis of the unofficial Simone album Gifted & Black, released in 1970). A few months later, as Alan Light tells it in What Happened, Miss Simone? – A Biography (2011), someone at Bethlehem Records in New York heard the demo recordings and became "interested in signing her to the label". Nadine Cohodas, in Princess Noire: The Tumultuous Reign of Nina Simone (2010), writes: "Bethlehem employed Lee Kraft as an occasional talent scout. He brought musical prospects to Gus Wildi, Bethlehem’s founder, and then Wildi and his associates decided if they wanted to make a record. Kraft had heard Nina at a club in Philadelphia and thought Bethlehem should record her." However, continues Cohodas, there is another version to the story. "Vivian Bailey, a Philadelphia businessman who first heard Nina at the Rittenhouse, said he had arranged for her to make a demo [...] He took the tape to New York and played it for Wildi. 'Her beautiful and unique vocal quality caused us to sign her immediately to a recording contract,' Wildi recalled."

In December 1957, writes Light, Simone "went to New York and recorded thirteen songs backed by bassist Jimmy Bond and drummer Tootie Heath [...] The selections were essentially the songs she played as her set at the time but, given the time restraints of a studio recording, without her extended improvisations." Mauro Boscarol (of the Nina Simone Timeline) writes that the album was recorded in late 1957, possibly December, but the precise date is not known; and that the session lasted 13 hours and 14 songs were recorded. Cohodas agrees with the problem about designating the correct date, and corroborates 14 as the number of tracks recorded. Given that the session was the only one Simone ever recorded for Bethlehem, the songs eventually released show that there were, as Boscarol and Cohodas claim, 14 tracks recorded at the session.

At the time of the recording session, Simone was in her mid-20s and still aspiring to be a classical concert pianist, so she immediately sold the rights for the album to Bethlehem for $3,000 (equal to US$33,478 in 2025). According to Simone's later account, she did not really enjoy the session, no more than her gigs at the time, as she "still considered herself on a musical detour dictated by financial necessity"; upon returning to Philadelphia, she "immersed herself in Beethoven for three days straight". The Bethlehem deal would eventually cost her royalty profits of more than a million dollars.

=== Release ===
Professional ratings
Review scores
Source	Rating
AllMusic	4/5 stars
Encyclopedia of Popular Music	4/5 stars

Simone was also dissatisfied by the time it took for Bethlehem to release the album and the lack of effort the record company took in promoting her. However, unbeknownst to Simone, Bethlehem was in financial trouble. "Wildi found himself in a cash crunch, and in the middle of 1958 he sold a half interest in Bethlehem to Syd Nathan, who ran King Records out of Cincinnati"; furthermore, there were to be "professional differences between Wildi and Nathan". All these factors led to disruption at Bethlehem, and affected the release of Simone's album significantly.

The album was first announced around a year after it had been recorded in Billboard magazine in December 1958. But nothing happened. Then in the January 10, 1959, issue of Cash Box, the "Record Ramblings" column posted news out of Philadelphia: "Now that the Xmas rush is over the entire wax business in town is looking forward, with great expectancy, towards ’59 [...] King's Al Farrio back from the vacation scene while Mario D'Aullaria goes on his after the hectic Christmas weeks. The boys both very high on the new [...] femme-jazz newcomer Nina Simone."

The album was released in February 1959. It features eleven of the tracks from the late 1957 recording session.

=== Title ===
The title of the album also appears to have caused some confusion. The first copies of the album were released with Nina Simone's name on the front of record sleeve, and the title reading: Jazz as Played in an Exclusive Side Street Club. In March, for instance, the Philadelphia Tribune ran an advertisement for a gig Simone was playing in Atlantic City at the Club Harlem, which told readers with some hyperbole that in addition to being the "Nation’s newest sensation," she also had an album out: Jazz as Played in an Exclusive East Side Street Club. This had "apparently been one of the proposed titles for Little Girl Blue and was featured as a subtitle in some versions." Furthermore, while Cash Box had listed the album's title as Little Girl Blue in its February 14 edition "February Album Releases", when the album entered the charts later in the year, it would list it as simply Nina Simone. For instance, the August 22 edition of Cash Box still lists the album as Nina Simone (while at position number 32 on its Top 100 Best Selling Tunes), the title Little Girl Blue being used for the August 29 edition onward (as it reached position number 27). Later releases of the album would sometimes use one title or the other, such as Little Girl Blue (1992 Extended Version) and Jazz as Played in an Exclusive Side Street Club (2002 Extended Version and Remaster).

=== Promotion ===
Adding to Simone's disillusionment with Bethlehem, the company had also not issued a lead single to promote the album, either immediately before or immediately after the album release. As Alan Light tells it, "part of Simone's frustration with Bethlehem came from their resistance to issuing a single". However, "Sid Mark, a disc jockey at WHAT in Philadelphia [...] had started playing her recording of 'I Loves You, Porgy' on air, sometimes multiple times in a row." When Bethlehem became aware of this, they apparently rushed to issue it as a single. "I Loves You, Porgy" was released in May 1959, the May 30 edition of Cash Box writing in their "Record Reviews" section that it was "a beautifully sensitive performance". Within a few months it had become a hit, peaking at number 18 on the pop charts, and number 2 on the R&B charts. Helped by the success of the single, the album too went on to become a hit.

=== Aftermath ===
However, in the meantime, Simone had already began talking to Colpix Records about a new contract, going on to sign with it in April 1959. So soon after Little Girl Blue was out, and before Bethlehem had released "I Loves You, Porgy", Simone recorded her second album: The Amazing Nina Simone. Colpix released the lead single "Chilly Winds Don't Blow" in June 1959, just a week or so after Bethlehem rush-released "I Loves You, Porgy". Ironically, "I Loves You, Porgy" was a hit single, and "Chilly Winds Don't Blow" did not chart.^{Ref. missing}

The success of "I Loves You, Porgy" resulted in Bethlehem going on to exploit its Simone recordings for the next couple of years, all without her consent. On the one hand, the following March the label released the album Nina Simone and Her Friends (1960). This compilation album had four tracks each from Simone, Carmen McRae, and Chris Connor (all three artists had left the label by this time). With respect to the Simone tracks, the album featured, along with "I Loves You, Porgy", the remaining three cuts from the 1957 recording session. On the other hand, Bethlehem would go on to release a series of singles. Thus over the next couple of years Simone singles would come both from the new material she was recording for Colpix, and from the 1957 Bethlehem session. Bethlehem would go on to release every track from that session either as A-side or B-side (and sometimes both) with the final single appearing in August 1962.

== Track listing ==
Fourteen tracks were recorded at the December 1957 session for the album, of which eleven of the songs were included in the release of Little Girl Blue in February 1959.

No.	Title	Writer(s)	Length
1.	"Mood Indigo"	Duke Ellington, Barney Bigard, Irving Mills	4:04
2.	"Don't Smoke in Bed"	Willard Robison	3:14
3.	"He Needs Me"	Arthur Hamilton	2:31
4.	"Little Girl Blue"	Richard Rodgers, Lorenz Hart	4:19
5.	"Love Me or Leave Me"	Walter Donaldson, Gus Kahn	3:24
6.	"My Baby Just Cares for Me"	Walter Donaldson, Gus Kahn	3:38
7.	"Good Bait (instrumental)"	Count Basie, Tadd Dameron	5:28
8.	"Plain Gold Ring"	George Stone (aka Earl Burroughs)	3:57
9.	"You'll Never Walk Alone (instrumental)"	Richard Rodgers, Oscar Hammerstein II	3:49
10.	"I Loves You, Porgy"	DuBose Heyward, George Gershwin, Ira Gershwin	4:12
11.	"Central Park Blues (instrumental)"	Nina Simone	6:52

=== Remaining tracks from the 1957 recording session ===
These tracks would appear on the contemporary album Nina Simone and Her Friends (1960) and as singles (either A-sides or B-sides) over the period of 1959–1962. The British Parlophone label as part of their 'Bethlehem Series' issued in 1962 a single called "The Intimate Nina Simone", with "I Loves You, Porgy" added to the three tracks. Some later editions of the album would include them as bonus tracks, such as Little Girl Blue (1992 Extended Version) and Jazz as Played in an Exclusive Side Street Club (2002 Remaster).

No.	Title	Writer(s)	Length
1.	"He's Got the Whole World in His Hands"	Traditional	3:12
2.	"For All We Know"	J. Fred Coots, Sam M. Lewis	4:03
3.	"African Mailman (instrumental)"	Nina Simone	3:08

== Personnel ==
- Nina Simone – vocals, piano, arrangements
- Jimmy Bond – double bass
- Albert "Tootie" Heath – drums

== Contemporary singles from the album ==
Initially, Bethlehem Records released no singles from Little Girl Blue, either before nor immediately after the album was released in February 1959. However, after Simone signed with Colpix Records in April of that year, Bethlehem rushed out the 7" "I Loves You, Porgy" and scored a hit. Bethlehem then went to release a series of singles from the Little Girl Blue album and the non-album tracks from the 1957 recording session over the next couple of years. During this series of single releases, every track of the album and session was released on single as either (and sometimes both) A-sides or B-sides.

Year	Month	Title: A Side / B Side	Notes
1959	May	"I Loves You, Porgy" / "Love Me or Leave Me"	Both tracks from Little Girl Blue
1959	September	"He Needs Me" / "Little Girl Blue"	Both tracks from Little Girl Blue
1959	November	"Don't Smoke in Bed" / "African Mailman"	A: Little Girl Blue / B: Non-album track; subsequently appeared on the Nina Simone and Her Friends (1960) compilation album
1960	January	"Mood Indigo" / "Central Park Blues"	Both tracks from Little Girl Blue
1960	February	"For All We Know" / "Good Bait"	A: Non-album track; previously appeared on the Nina Simone and Her Friends (1960) compilation album / B: Little Girl Blue
1960	May	"You'll Never Walk Alone" / "Plain Gold Ring"	Both tracks from Little Girl Blue
1960	July	"Central Park Blues" / "He's Got the Whole World in His Hands"	A: Little Girl Blue – already appeared on single as a B-side / B: Non-album track; previously appeared on the Nina Simone and Her Friends (1960) compilation album
1962	August	"My Baby Just Cares for Me" / "He Needs Me"	A: Little Girl Blue / B: Little Girl Blue – already appeared on single as a B-side

"My Baby Just Cares for Me" would be released as a single (both in its original form and as a 12" remix) in 1987, and become a hit in the UK then Europe. The extended remix would go on to be included in the 2002 remaster of Little Girl Blue, renamed Jazz as Played in an Exclusive Side Street Club.

== Significant reissues ==
=== My Baby Just Cares for Me (1987) ===
This album was a simple re-issue of Little Girl Blue but with a new title, cover, and the tracks in a different order. This re-issue was occasioned by the success of the single 'My Baby Just Cares For Me' in 1987, and the album led with this track. "My Baby Just Cares for Me" – which closed the original edition of Little Girl Blue – became a top 10 hit in the United Kingdom after it was used in a 1987 perfume commercial. This single then went on to hit the top 10 in several European single charts and peaked at number one in the Dutch Top 40. The album was released in the wake of this. In 1989, Cohodas reports, Simone hired Steven Ames Brown, a San Francisco lawyer who specialized in royalty recovery. Together they "sued a California distributor, Street Level Trading, and the British-based Charly Records for breach of contract in a licensing deal made in 1987 for Nina's Bethlehem recordings. The lawsuit charged that the two defendants were in breach of the deal and had committed fraud in the way they executed the arrangement. Nina claimed she was owed $200,000." In a slight reversal, Simone "had been so outspoken in criticizing Charly for failing to pay her proper royalties that the label filed a defamation suit against her in a London court and added Brown to the litigation, too, after he spoke out on her behalf. All the legal maneuvering tied up any royalty payments until Nina's suit was settled for an undisclosed sum in the summer of 1990. As part of the settlement Charly dropped the defamation claims."

=== Little Girl Blue (1992 Extended Version) ===
Little Girl Blue was reissued by Bethlehem in 1992 on CD (Bethlehem 30042), with the three additional tracks from the 1957 session that had previously appeared during the 1959–1962 period as 7"-vinyl single tracks (either A-sides or B-sides) and on the vinyl compilation album Nina Simone and Her Friends.

=== Jazz as Played in an Exclusive Side Street Club (2002 Remaster) ===
In 2002, the album was remastered and reissued under the subtitle of its original title, Jazz as Played in an Exclusive Side Street Club, by Charly / Snapper Music (SNAP 216 CD). As well as including the three session tracks like the 1992 re-issue, this album also included – anachronistically – "My Baby Just Cares for Me (Extended Version)". When the reissued single was a hit in 1987, there was also a twelve-inch single mix created, named the "Special Extended Smoochtime Version", with a 5.23 running time. This is the version of the track that is labeled "My Baby Just Cares for Me (Extended Version)" and closes Jazz as Played in an Exclusive Side Street Club.
