= I Loves You, Porgy =

Song from the 1935 opera Porgy and Bess

- Duet from Porgy and Bess by George Gershwin
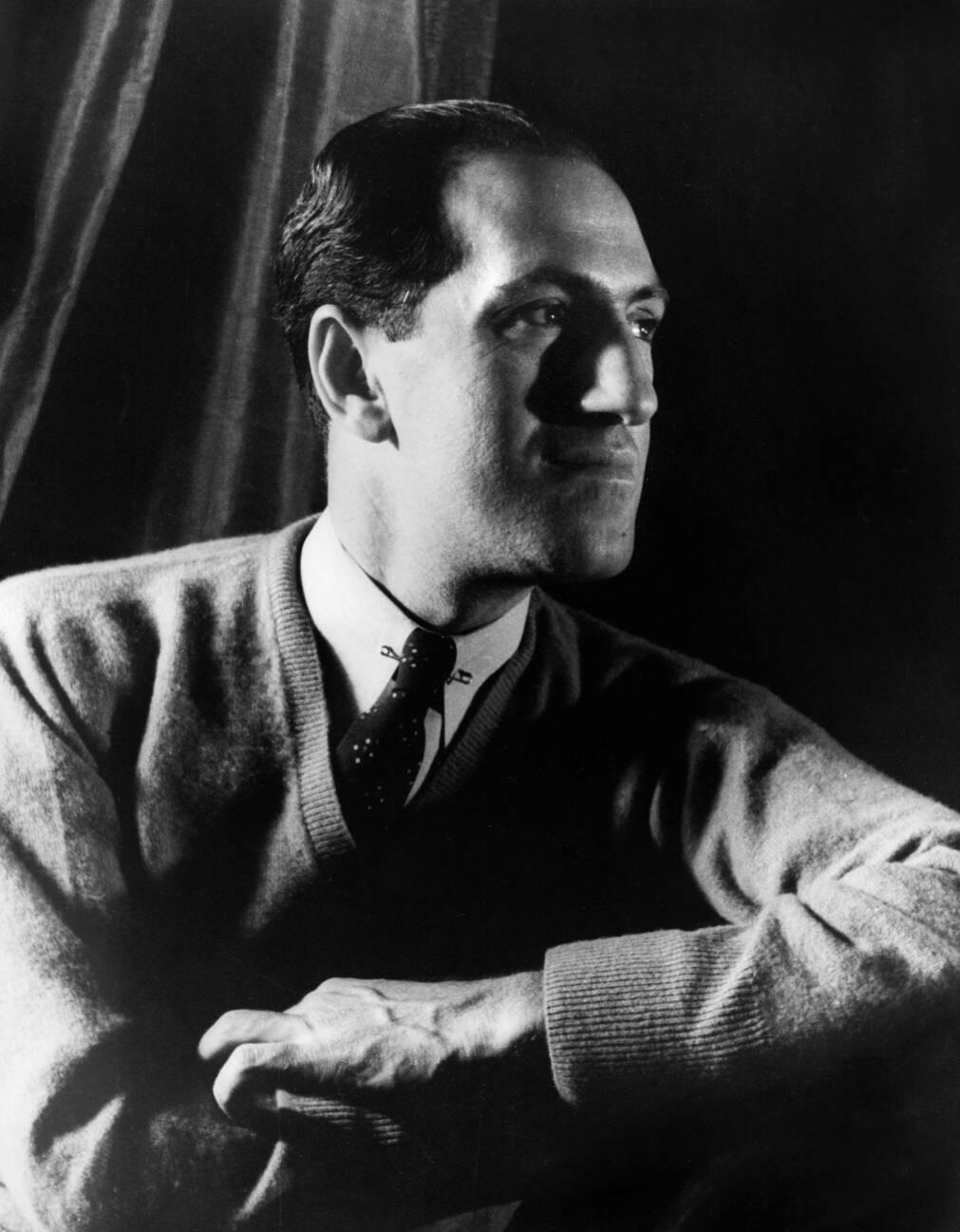
- Gershwin in 1937
- Genre: Opera, jazz
- Text: Ira Gershwin, DuBose Heyward

Premiere
- Date: 30 September 1935
- Location: Colonial Theatre (Boston)

"I Loves You, Porgy" is a duet from the 1935 opera Porgy and Bess with music by George Gershwin and lyrics by Ira Gershwin. It was performed in the opera's premiere in 1935 and on Broadway the same year by Anne Brown and Todd Duncan. They recorded the song on volume 2 of the album Selections from George Gershwin's Folk Opera Porgy and Bess in 1942. The duet occurs in act 2, scene 3, Catfish Row, with Bess's opening words, "I wants to stay here", and Porgy promising that he will protect her. Bess has a lover, Crown, who is abusive and continually seduces her.

The song was popularized by Nina Simone's adaptation from her 1959 debut album, Little Girl Blue.

== Analysis ==
=== Lyrics ===
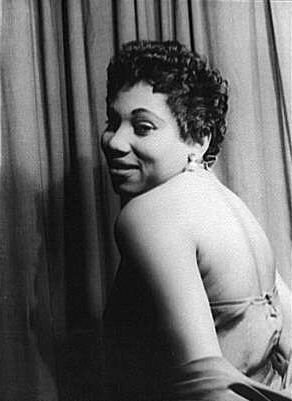
Leontyne Price as Bess (1953)

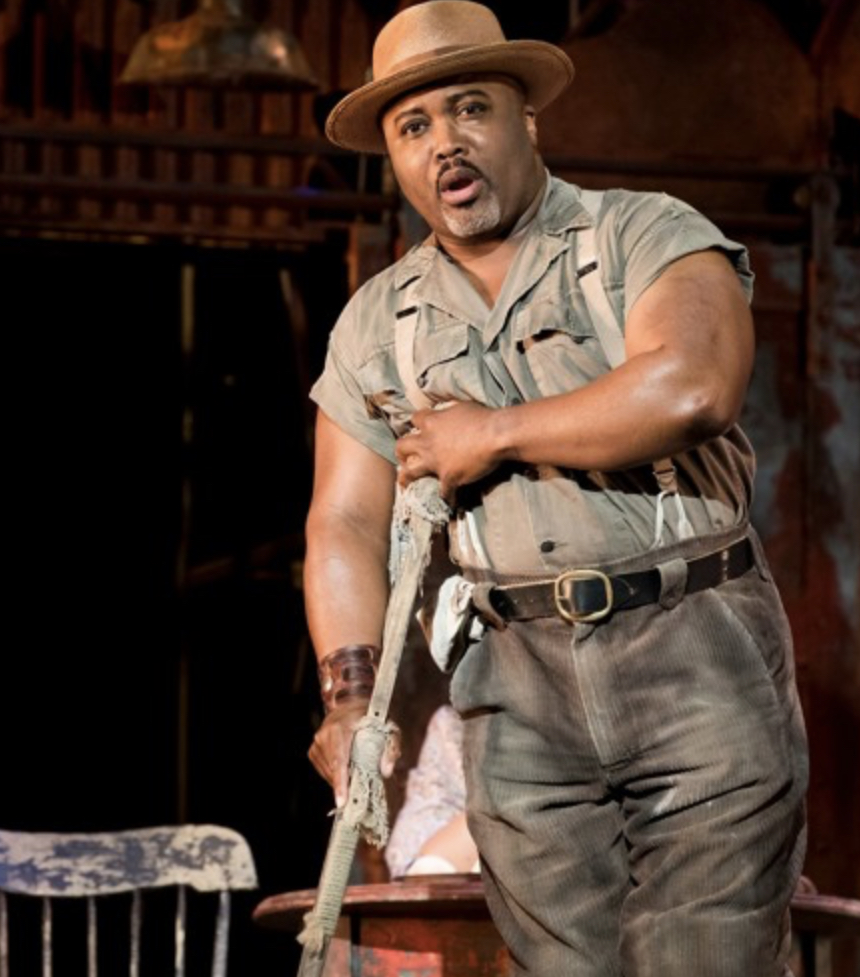
Kevin Short as Porgy (2018)

The scene opens with Bess awakening from her fever contracted on Kittiwah Island. Porgy tells Bess that he knows she has been with Crown, and she admits that Crown has promised to return for her. Porgy tells her she is free to go if she wants to, and she tells him that although she wants to stay ("I wants to stay here"), she is afraid of Crown ("But when he calls, I know I have to go"). Porgy asks her what would happen if there was no Crown, and Bess tells Porgy she loves him ("I loves you, Porgy") and begs him to protect her. Porgy promises that she will never have to be afraid again ("An' remember, when Crown come that's my business"). In the following duet they pledge their love for each other.

During the early stages of the opera Porgy and Bess, Bess' opening stanza was cut out. The re-addition of this stanza into the opera proved crucial in demonstrating Bess' feelings towards Porgy and Crown, as well as showing the extent of Bess's self-understanding. In contrast to the fatal tragedy of Georges Bizet's title character in Carmen and Alban Berg's Marie in Wozzeck, George Gershwin's Bess is a psychological tragedy. Musicologist Lawrence Starr writes, "she possesses profound self-understanding, and understanding of others, and yet cannot use this knowledge to really help herself do anything more than survive (which of course is already more than Carmen or Marie)."

=== Music ===
The conversation between Porgy and Bess at the beginning of the scene is sung as a accompanied recitative with some ariosos. The duet, in F major and 4/4 time, starts with Bess's da capo aria "I wants to stay here" / "Someday, I know he's coming back" / "I loves you, Porgy". Porgy then responds, accompanied by forceful orchestral chords, assuring Bess of his protection and a future happy life. The second part of Porgy's promises is accompanied by Bess's reprise of "I loves you, Porgy", and the duet ends with "I/you got my/a man."

Edward D. Latham contends that Gershwin's experimental use of simple rondo form with the main theme as the refrain echoes the tension between Porgy and Bess in the duet, "It is as if Bess is clinging to the refrain for dear life, afraid that if she wanders too far from it, she will lose Porgy's love for good. Once again, it is Porgy who guides Bess back to the home key, re-establishing F major with a half cadence at the end of the B and C sections." Gershwin thereby subverts the rondo forms as a guaranteed sign of confidence and stability into an indication of the situation's volatility.

On the technicality of Bess's role in the duet, Helen M. Greenwald, chair of the department of music history at New England Conservatory and editor of the Oxford Handbook of Opera, wrote that Bess's solo "requires the legato power of a Puccini heroine".

== Cultural significance ==
Nina Simone's release of "I Loves You, Porgy" in 1959 and conversations surrounding black representation were contemporaneous. Sarah Tomlinson claimed "while 'I Loves You, Porgy' was one of eleven tracks on her album, it was the only song that had previously been popularised by black women musicians. The song that launched Simone into the public eye was one that fit audience expectations of black women musicianship."

After Gershwin's death in 1937, Porgy and Bess was revived in New York in 1942, a production which toured as well. The popular hits from the opera ("I Loves You, Porgy", "Summertime") maintained circulation on the radio. Leading orchestras in America had "all-Gershwin" programs. Nina Simone's recording of the song (from her first album, Little Girl Blue, 1958) went to number eighteen on the Billboard Hot 100 and number two on the R&B charts. Christina Aguilera performed the song at the Grammy Nomination Concert in December 2008.

== Criticism ==
Whilst the folk opera has received criticism that Gershwin biographer Rodney Greenberg describes as a questioning of whether the characters are "the same old black stereotypes with their naive superstitions, their whoring and their gambling?", Bess' character in the opera and her lines in the duet have been praised for adding complexity to her character's psyche.

Hall Johnson, who was outspoken on his disagreement with the opera's recitatives, found Bess' duet to be "such vibrant beauty, so replete with the tragedy of the minor spirituals, that most of what follows is made to sound a little more false by reason of the absolute rightness of this episode".

Maya Angelou, who danced in Porgy and Bess' premiere at Milan's La Scala opera house, writes how she connected with the story, also finding the duet's narrative to be compelling: "Who could deny this story? How many Black men had been crippled by American oppression and had lost the women they loved and who loved them, because they hadn't the strength to fight? How often had the women submitted to loveless arrangements for the sake of bare survival?"
