= Teenage Triangle =

Compilation album by Shelley Fabares, James Darren and Paul Petersen
- Released: April 1963
- Recorded: various
- Genre: Pop
- Label: Colpix
- Producer: Stu Phillips

Shelley Fabares, James Darren and Paul Petersen chronology
| The Things We Did Last Summer (1962) | ''Teenage Triangle'' (1963) | Bye Bye Birdie (1963) |

Teenage Triangle is a joint compilation album by three pop artists, Shelley Fabares, James Darren and Paul Petersen. It was released in 1963 on Colpix Records and included 12 tracks with four songs from each of the three singers, most of which were previously released. The album was produced and arranged by Stu Phillips. It was available in both mono and stereo, catalogue numbers CP-444 and SCP-444.

A follow-up compilation featuring the same artists, More Teenage Triangle, was released by Colpix in 1964.

== Reception ==
Teenage Triangle peaked on the Billboard Top LPs chart at No. 48 in May 1963. Seven of the singles were U.S. Top 40 hits; two from Fabares, two from Petersen and three from Darren.

== Track listing ==
Side 1

| No. | Title | Length |
|---|---|---|
| 1. | "Goodbye Cruel World (James Darren)" | 2:24 |
| 2. | "Johnny Angel (Shelley Fabares)" | 2:21 |
| 3. | "She Can't Find Her Keys (Paul Petersen)" | 2:32 |
| 4. | "Her Royal Majesty (James Darren)" | 2:13 |
| 5. | "Johnny Loves Me (Shelley Fabares)" | 2:21 |
| 6. | "Keep Your Love Locked (Paul Petersen)" | 2:12 |

Side 2

| No. | Title | Length |
|---|---|---|
| 7. | "Gidget (James Darren)" | 2:30 |
| 8. | "The Things We Did Last Summer (Shelley Fabares)" | 2:27 |
| 9. | "Lollipops and Roses (Paul Petersen)" | 2:23 |
| 10. | "Conscience (James Darren)" | 2:33 |
| 11. | "I'm Growing Up (Shelley Fabares)" | 2:14 |
| 12. | "Little Boy Sad (Paul Petersen)" | 1:44 |

== Charts ==
| Chart (1963) | Peak position |
|---|---|
| US Billboard Top LPs | 48 |

== Re-release ==
In 1999, both Teenage Triangle and More Teenage Triangle were released for the first time on compact disc in their entirety as a "twofer" CD by Westside Records. It included the original liner notes from the albums.
