= Shelley! =

Studio album by Shelley Fabares
- Released: June 1962
- Recorded: September 8–11, 1961; April 9, 1962; April 27, 1962; May 5, 1962
- Genre: Pop
- Label: Colpix
- Producer: Stu Phillips

Shelley Fabares chronology
Shelley! (1962)	The Things We Did Last Summer (1962)

Singles from Shelley!
- 1. "Johnny Angel" Released: February 1962

Shelley! is the self-titled debut pop album by singer and actress Shelley Fabares, released in 1962 on Colpix Records. It was available in both mono and stereo, catalogue numbers CP-426 and SCP-426. The album was produced and arranged by Stu Phillips and recorded at United Western Recorders in Hollywood, California. Shelley! peaked on the Billboard Top LPs chart at No. 106 in July 1962. The album includes the hit single, "Johnny Angel", which reached number one on the Billboard Hot 100 in April 1962.

Shelley! features a guest appearance by Paul Petersen on the track "Very Unlikely". The backup vocals were performed by the girl group The Blossoms.

== Reception ==
Professional ratings
Review scores
Source	Rating
AllMusic	3.5/5 stars

Shelley! was released in June 1962. One month after its release the album charted at No. 106 on the Billboard Top LPs chart. The first single from the album was "Johnny Angel", performed by Fabares on The Donna Reed Show during the show's fourth season. The song was released shortly before her Shelley! album and became a #1 US Hot 100 hit for two weeks on the pop chart. "Johnny Angel" sold over a million copies and was awarded a gold disc. "Johnny Angel" also charted at #41 on the UK Singles Chart and peaked at #1 in Canada. Fabares lip-synched her hit single on American Bandstand during a June 19, 1962 television appearance to promote the album.

== Track listing ==
=== Side one ===
No.	Title	Writer(s)	Length
1.	"Love Letters"	Edward Heyman, Victor Young	2:13
2.	"Picnic"	George Duning, Steve Allen	2:10
3.	"Johnny Angel"	Lee Pockriss, Lyn Duddy	2:21
4.	"True Love"	Cole Porter	2:33
5.	"Boy of My Own"	Fred Tobias, Lee Pockriss	2:07
6.	"Where's It Gonna Get Me"	Kenny Jacobson, Rhoda Roberts	2:11

=== Side two ===
No.	Title	Writer(s)	Length
7.	"It's Been A Long, Long Time"	Jule Styne, Sammy Cahn	2:01
8.	"Funny Face"	Carole King, Gerry Goffin	2:13
9.	"I'm Growing Up"	George Devens	2:13
10.	"Hi-Lili, Hi-Lo"	Bronisław Kaper, Helen Deutsch	2:17
11.	"Very Unlikely" (with guest Paul Petersen)	Peter Udell, Gary Geld	2:41

== Recording dates ==
The following recording date information is taken from the liner notes of the 1994 CD compilation The Best of Shelley Fabares.

- September 8–11, 1961– "Where's It Gonna Get Me", "Johnny Angel", "Very Unlikely"
- April 9, 1962– "I’m Growing Up", "Boy of My Own"
- April 27, 1962– "Love Letters", "True Love", "It’s Been a Long, Long Time", "Funny Face"
- May 5, 1962– "Picnic", "Hi Lilli, Hi-Lo"

== Charts ==
Chart (1962)	Peak position
US Billboard Top LPs	106

== Re-release ==
Shelley! was released on compact disc in its entirety for the first time as part of a 2 LPs on 1-CD set released by Collectables in September 2000. This included the original liner notes from the 1962 album.
