= The Things We Did Last Summer (album) =

Studio album by Shelley Fabares
- Released: September 1962
- Recorded: April 9, 1962; August 1, 1962; August 2, 1962; August 3, 1962
- Genre: Pop
- Label: Colpix
- Producer: Stu Phillips

Shelley Fabares chronology
| Shelley! (1962) | The Things We Did Last Summer (1962) | Teenage Triangle (1963) |

Singles from The Things We Did Last Summer
- 1. "Johnny Loves Me" Released: May 1962; 2. "The Things We Did Last Summer" Released: August 1962

The Things We Did Last Summer is the second studio pop album by singer and actress Shelley Fabares, released in 1962 on Colpix Records. It was available in both mono and stereo, catalogue numbers CP-431 and SCP-431. The album was produced and arranged by Stu Phillips, who had produced her previous album. It peaked on the Billboard 200 albums chart at #121 in October 1962. The album features her Top 40 hit single "Johnny Loves Me". It also includes the second hit single from the album, her cover version of the 1946 pop standard "The Things We Did Last Summer".

== Reception ==
The Things We Did Last Summer was released in September 1962. One month after its release the album charted at #121 on the Billboard 200 Chart. The first single taken from The Things We Did Last Summer was "Johnny Loves Me". The song was released a few months ahead of the album and was the follow-up single to her previous hit "Johnny Angel" from her debut album Shelley!. "Johnny Loves Me" charted on the Billboard Hot 100 pop chart at number 21 in July 1962. It also peaked at number 7 on the Easy Listening (Adult Contemporary) chart. The second single taken from the album was "The Things We Did Last Summer" which peaked at #46 on the Billboard Hot 100.

== Track listing ==
=== Side one ===
| No. | Title | Writer(s) | Length |
|---|---|---|---|
| 1. | "The Things We Did Last Summer" | Jule Styne, Sammy Cahn | 2:27 |
| 2. | "Vacation" | Connie Francis, Hank Hunter, Gary Weston | 2:20 |
| 3. | "Breaking Up Is Hard to Do" | Neil Sedaka, Howard Greenfield | 2:05 |
| 4. | "Roses Are Red" | Al Byron, Paul Evans | 2:42 |
| 5. | "Johnny Loves Me" | Barry Mann, Cynthia Weil | 2:21 |
| 6. | "Sealed with a Kiss" | Gary Geld, Peter Udell | 2:39 |

=== Side two ===
| No. | Title | Writer(s) | Length |
|---|---|---|---|
| 7. | "The Loco-Motion" | Gerry Goffin, Carole King | 2:10 |
| 8. | "It Keeps Right On a-Hurtin'" | Johnny Tillotson | 2:50 |
| 9. | "Johnny Get Angry" | Hal David, Sherman Edwards | 2:24 |
| 10. | "See You in September" | Sid Wayne, Sherman Edwards | 2:11 |
| 11. | "I'm Growing Up" | George Devens | 2:14 |
| 12. | "Palisades Park" | Chuck Barris | 1:55 |

== Recording dates ==
The following recording date information is taken from the liner notes of the 1994 CD compilation The Best of Shelley Fabares.

- April 9, 1962– "Johnny Loves Me", "I’m Growing Up" (Note: "I’m Growing Up", while first appearing on Shelley!, also makes its second appearance here, but uses an alternate mix.)
- August 1, 1962– "Breaking Up Is Hard to Do", "Vacation", "Roses Are Red", "Sealed with a Kiss"
- August 2, 1962– "The Loco-Motion", "Palisades Park", "Johnny Get Angry", "See You in September", "It Keeps Right On a-Hurtin'"
- August 3, 1962– "The Things We Did Last Summer"

== Charts ==
| Chart (1962) | Peak position |
|---|---|
| US Billboard Top LPs | 121 |

== Re-release ==
The Things We Did Last Summer was released on compact disc in its entirety for the first time as part of a 2 LPs on 1 CD set that also featured her debut solo album Shelley!. It was released by Collectables in September 2000 and included the original liner notes from the original 1962 recording.
