= Nina Simone in Concert =

Live album by Nina Simone
- Released: 1964
- Recorded: March 21, April 1 & 6 1964
- Venue: Carnegie Hall, New York City
- Genre: Vocal jazz
- Length: 35:58
- Label: Philips
- Producer: Hal Mooney

Nina Simone chronology
Nina Simone with Strings (1966)	Nina Simone in Concert (1964)	Broadway-Blues-Ballads (1964)

Professional ratings
Review scores
Source	Rating
AllMusic	4.5/5 stars
Pitchfork	10/10

Nina Simone in Concert is an album by the jazz singer Nina Simone. It is her first album for the record label Philips, composed of three live recordings made at Carnegie Hall, New York City, in March and April 1964. Simone recorded Nina Simone at Carnegie Hall in 1963 for Colpix.

This album marked the beginning of Simone's explicitly Civil Rights oriented music and she incorporated such messaging in her performances. Included on the album are unambiguous political songs such as "Mississippi Goddamn", released as a single at the time. However, songs such as "Old Jim Crow", "Go Limp", and "Pirate Jenny" contributed to the political and civil rights messaging in a more covert or metaphorical way.

The album was rated as the 94th best album of the 1960s by Pitchfork.

== Background ==
- Simone first recorded "I Loves You, Porgy", "Plain Gold Ring", and "Don't Smoke in Bed" on her debut album Little Girl Blue (1958).
- "Pirate Jenny" was from The Threepenny Opera by Kurt Weill and Bertold Brecht. Simone used the story within the song as a metaphor for the civil rights movement at that time. Simone rarely performed the song, though the theatrical piece became one of her signature tunes.
- "Old Jim Crow" was a protest song against Jim Crow laws.
- "Go Limp" was a humorous folk song about a girl who is warned by her mother not to join the NAACP because it would cost her her virginity. Halfway through the song Simone forgot the lyrics and improvised the rest of the words. At the end she received a standing ovation.
- "Mississippi Goddam" is a protest song written by Simone in 1963 immediately after the Alabama Church Bombing that killed four young girls. A minute into the performance, Simone addresses the audience, saying "This is a show tune, but the show hasn't been written for it yet."

== Track listing ==
No.	Title	Writer(s)	Length
1.	"I Loves You Porgy"	George Gershwin, Ira Gershwin, DuBose Heyward	2:18
2.	"Plain Gold Ring"	Earl Burroughs	5:30
3.	"Pirate Jenny"	Kurt Weill, Bertolt Brecht, Marc Blitzstein	6:42
4.	"Old Jim Crow"	Nina Simone, Jackie Alper, Ron Vander Groef	2:10
5.	"Don't Smoke in Bed"	Willard Robison	5:30
6.	"Go Limp"	Alex Comfort, Simone	6:55
7.	"Mississippi Goddam"	Simone	4:45
Total length:			35:58

== Personnel ==
- Nina Simone – piano, vocals, arranger
- Rudy Stevenson – guitar
- Lisle Atkinson – bass
- Bobby Hamilton – drums

=== Production ===
- Hal Mooney – record producer
- Nat Shapiro – liner notes
- Mort Shuman – cover photo

== Charts ==
Chart (1964)	Peak position
Billboard 200	102
