= Lollipops and Roses (album) =

Studio album by Paul Petersen
- Released: August 1962
- Recorded: 1962
- Genre: Pop
- Label: Colpix
- Producer: Stu Phillips

Paul Petersen chronology
Lollipops and Roses (1962)	My Dad (1963)

Singles from Lollipops and Roses
- 1. "She Can't Find Her Keys" Released: February 1962; 2. "What Did They Do Before Rock 'N' Roll" Released: April 1962; 3. "Keep Your Love Locked" Released: 1962

Lollipops and Roses is the debut studio pop album by singer and actor Paul Petersen released in 1962 on Colpix Records and included 12 songs. The album was available in both mono and stereo, catalogue numbers CP-429 and SCP-429. Lollipops and Roses was produced and arranged by Stu Phillips and was recorded at United Western Recorders in Hollywood, California.

== Reception ==
Although the album failed to chart on the Billboard albums chart, the first single "She Can't Find Her Keys" was a hit that peaked at No. 19 on the Billboard Hot 100. The second single "What Did They Do Before Rock 'N' Roll" featured a guest appearance with Shelley Fabares. The song "Keep Your Love Locked," was composed by the team of Gerry Goffin and Carole King.

== Track listing ==
Side one

No.	Title	Length
1.	"She Can't Find Her Keys"	2:33
2.	"Keep Your Love Locked"	2:13
3.	"Little Boy Sad"	1:42
4.	"Be Everything To Anyone You Love"	2:04
5.	"Mama, Your Little Boy Fell"	2:07
6.	"One Girl"	2:10

Side two

No.	Title	Length
7.	"Lollipops and Roses"	2:24
8.	"Love Me Tender"	2:03
9.	"Please Mr. Sun"	2:14
10.	"Blue Moon"	2:20
11.	"Penny Is Seventeen"	2:12
12.	"What Did They Do Before Rock 'N' Roll (with Shelley Fabares)"	2:09

== Re-release ==
Lollipops and Roses was released on compact disc in its entirety for the first time as part of a 2 LPs on 1-CD set released by Collectables in June 1999.
