= Carl Betz =

American actor (1921–1978)

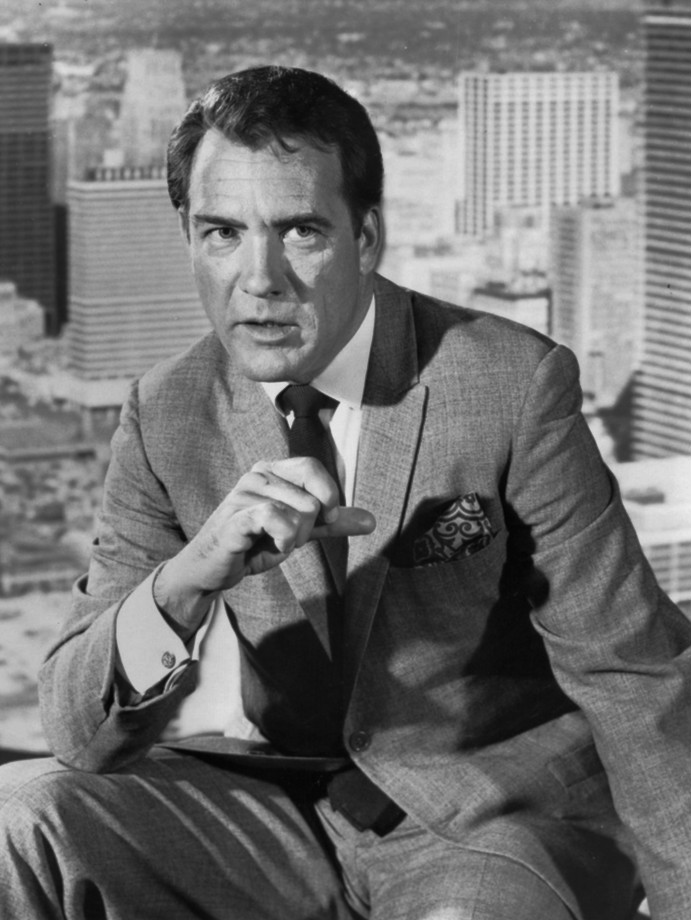
- Betz as Clinton Judd (1967)
- Born: Carl Lawrence Betz; March 9, 1921; Pittsburgh, Pennsylvania, U.S.
- Died: January 18, 1978 (aged 56); Los Angeles, California, U.S.
- Education: Duquesne University; Carnegie Mellon University (BFA)
- Years active: 1952–1977
- Spouses: Lois Harmon (m. 1952; div. 1961) Gloria Stone Martin (m. 1963–1978)
- Children: 1

Carl Lawrence Betz (March 9, 1921 – January 18, 1978) was an American stage, film, and television actor. He appeared in a variety of television series, including the CBS soap opera Love of Life; he is best remembered for playing Donna Reed's television husband, Dr. Alex Stone, from 1958 to 1966 in the ABC sitcom The Donna Reed Show. Then between 1967 and 1969, Betz played defense attorney Clinton Judd in ABC's courtroom drama Judd, for the Defense, winning an Emmy Award in 1969 for his work on that series.

== Early years ==
Betz was born in Pittsburgh, Pennsylvania, in 1921, the eldest child of Carl W. and Mary Leona Betz. His siblings were Mary Louise, Leona Ruth, and William Harlow. His father was a native of Missouri; and according to the federal census of 1930, was then the chief chemist at a local laboratory and later, by 1940, for Allegheny County.

Growing up in the Pittsburgh suburbs of Crafton and Mt. Lebanon, Betz began his amateur acting career at the age of 10, when he formed a theatrical company with six friends who performed plays in his grandmother's basement. After graduating from Mt. Lebanon High School in 1939, he won a scholarship to Duquesne University. Beginning in 1942, Betz served three and a half years in the U.S. Army during World War II, seeing action in North Africa and Italy.

After the war, Betz returned to Carnegie Tech and earned a degree in drama. After graduation, he worked as a radio announcer and disk jockey before moving to New York City. Betz continued working in summer- and winter-stock companies and also worked for a while as a doorman at Radio City Music Hall.

== Career ==
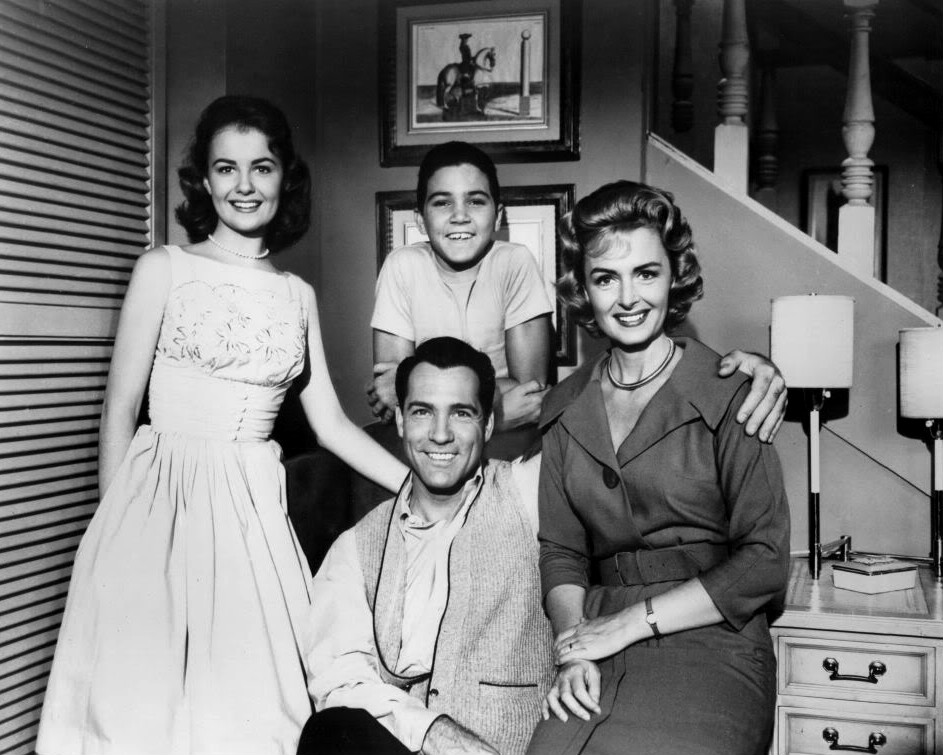
Donna Reed as Donna Stone, Paul Petersen as Jeff Stone, Carl Betz as Dr. Alex Stone, Shelley Fabares as Mary Stone, The Donna Reed Show (1960)

Betz made his Broadway debut in 1952 in The Long Watch, and toured with Veronica Lake in the summer-stock play, The Voice of the Turtle. He then appeared for 18 months as Collie Jordan on Love of Life. Prior to his eight-year run on The Donna Reed Show, Betz made guest appearances on such television series as Sheriff of Cochise, Perry Mason, Gunsmoke (as Nate Timble and Jim Glass, an outlaw trying to go straight under an assumed name in the 1957 episode “Gone Straight” - credited as “Carl Bentz”), The Millionaire, and Alfred Hitchcock Presents.

For the summers of 1956 and 1957, Betz appeared as the Summer stock Leading Man at the Elitch Theatre and he appeared in a production of The Seven Year Itch with Anne Kimbell.

In 1958, Betz was cast as pediatrician Dr. Alex Stone in ABC sitcom The Donna Reed Show. The show revolves around the home and school problems of a middle-class American family in the late 1950s through the mid-1960s. Alex was often called upon to rescue wife Donna Stone (Reed) from awkward situations and to monitor the behavior of their children, Mary (Shelley Fabares) and Jeff (Paul Petersen). Jeff Stone introduced the sentimental hit song "My Dad" in a 1962 episode, specifically singing the tune to Betz. The series was a hit for ABC and aired for eight seasons from September 1958 to March 1966. During the run of the series, Betz continued acting in stage roles during the show's hiatus. In 1964, he appeared as Reverend T. Lawrence Shannon in a limited stage run of The Night of the Iguana, for which he earned excellent reviews.

After The Donna Reed Show was cancelled, Betz returned to television roles and stage work. In 1967, producer Paul Monash offered Betz the role of defense lawyer Clinton Judd in the legal drama Judd, for the Defense. Monash had seen Betz's performance in Night of the Iguana in 1964 and was impressed with his acting. Betz initially thought the role was for a guest spot, but soon realized Monash had proposed that he star in a new series. Betz initially had misgivings, stating, "I did not want to do another series, you get bored", but eventually relented, because he liked the scripts. The series, which premiered on ABC in September 1967, was praised by critics, but struggled in the ratings. Shortly after ABC cancelled the series in 1969, Betz won the Primetime Emmy Award for Outstanding Continued Performance by an Actor in a Leading Role in a Dramatic Series for his work on the series. He also made many guest appearances on a variety of popular television shows, such as Mission: Impossible, The Mod Squad, Love, American Style, and Starsky & Hutch. One of his last roles was as General Douglas MacArthur in the one-man stage play I Shall Return.

== Personal life and death ==
Betz was married twice and had one child. In June 1952, he married actress Lois Harmon with whom he had a son, Richard. The couple separated in May 1960 and divorced in 1961. In December 1963, Betz married Gloria Stone Martin, sister of actress Nita Talbot. Through his marriage to Martin, Betz had a stepdaughter, Rio. Gloria and he remained together for 15 years, until Carl's death.

In 1977, Betz was diagnosed with terminal and inoperable lung cancer. He kept his diagnosis private in order to continue working. On November 29, 1977, Betz entered Cedars-Sinai Medical Center in Los Angeles. He died seven weeks later, on January 18, 1978, at age 56. His remains were cremated.

== Broadway credits ==
Date	Production	Role
March 20–29, 1952	The Long Day	Lieutenant Dick Bennett

== Filmography ==
Film
Year	Title	Role	Notes
1952	O. Henry's Full House	Jimmie Valentine — Prologue	Uncredited
1952	My Pal Gus	Mr. Nelson	Uncredited
1952	The President's Lady	Charles Dickinson	
1953	Powder River	Loney Logan	
1953	Inferno	Lieutenant Mike Platt	
1953	Vicki	Detective McDonald	
1953	City of Bad Men	Deputy Phil Ryan	
1953	Dangerous Crossing	John Bowman	
1966	Spinout	Howard Foxhugh	
1975	The Boy Who Talked to Badgers	Will MacDonald	
1975	The Meal	Jake Matheson	Alternative title: Deadly Encounter
1975	That Lady from Peking	Max Foster	Alternative title: That Girl from Peking

Television
Year	Title	Role	Notes
1953	Your Jeweler's Showcase		Episode: "Lady's Choice"
1954	Waterfront	Dave Herrick	Episode: "The Skipper's Day"
1954	Kraft Television Theatre		Episode: "Party for Jonathan"
1954	The Big Story	Charles McKinney	Episode: "Charles McKinney of the Tulsa World"
1954	Robert Montgomery Presents		Episode: "Two Wise Woman"
1954–1955	Love of Life	Collie Jordan	Regular cast member
1956	I Spy		Episode: "Dishonored Hero"
1956	Appointment with Adventure	Walter Pollard	Episode: "Suburban Terror"
1956	Crusader	Inspector Alan Kingman	2 episodes
1957	The Alcoa Hour	Howard Miller	Episode: "No License to Kill"
1957	Gunsmoke	Nate Timble aka Jim Glass	Episode: "Gone Straight"
1957	Panic!	Co-Pilot Terry Blake	Episode: "The Airline Hostess"
1957	Sheriff of Cochise	Paul Sloan	Episode: "Statute of Limitations"
1957–1958	The Millionaire	Miller; Phil Williams	2 episodes: One was "The Story of Rose Russell"
1958	Perry Mason	Dr. Ralph Chandler	Episode: "The Case of the Sun Bather's Diary"
1958	Alfred Hitchcock Presents	Jerome Stanton	Season 3 Episode 17: "The Motive"
1958	Alfred Hitchcock Presents	Store Detective	Season 3 Episode 20: "On the Nose"
1958	The Silent Service	LCDR Roy Benson	Episode: "Mine for Keeps"
1958	Broken Arrow	Trent	Episode: "Jeopardy"
1958	Mickey Spillane's Mike Hammer	Butler Tilton	Episode: "A Detective Tail"
1958–1966	The Donna Reed Show	Dr. Alex Stone	272 episodes
1967–1969	Judd, for the Defense	Clinton Judd	50 episodes
1968	Premiere	Dr. Frank Chandler	Episode: "Crisis"
1968–1974	Insight	Father Ryan; Walter P. Hendricks; General Dodd	3 episodes
1969	Felony Squad	Clinton Judd	Episode: "The Law and Order Blues"
1969	The Monk	Danny Gouzenko	Television movie
1969	Love, American Style	John Fillmore	Segment: "Love and the Former Marriage"
1969–1971	The F.B.I.	Gar Shelton; Martin Ashton	2 episodes
1970	Bracken's World	Jeffrey Harris	Episode: "Money Men"
1970	Medical Center	Jason Purcell	Episode: "The V.D. Story"
1970	McCloud	Aldon F. Flanders	Episode: "Who Says You Can't Make Friends in New York City?"
1970	Ironside	Jason Banning	Episode: "The Lonely Way to Go"
1970	Night Gallery	Dr. Max Redford	Segment: "The Dead Man"
1970–1972	Mission: Impossible	General Yuri Kozani; Dutch Krebbs	2 episodes
1971	The Mod Squad	R.J. Coleman	Episode: "A Bummer for R.J."
1971	In Search of America	Ben Olson	ABC Movie of the Week
1971	The Deadly Dream	Dr. Howard Geary	ABC Movie of the Week
1972	Norman Corwin Presents		Episode: "The Joy of Living"
1972	Cannon	Arthur Bellamy	Episode: "The Endangered Species"
1972	The Streets of San Francisco	Jeff Williams	Episode: "The Bullet"
1973	Set This Town on Fire	Andy Wells	Television movie
1973	Barnaby Jones	Marshall Briggs	Episode: "Stand-In for Death"
1973	The Magician	Paul Ryerson	Episode: "Man on Fire"
1973	The New Perry Mason	Clinton Exeter	Episode: "The Case of the Spurious Spouse"
1974	Killdozer!	Dennis Holvig	ABC Movie of the Week
1974	Marcus Welby, M.D.	Dr. Simon Bryant	Episode: "No Gods in Sight"
1975	The Daughters of Joshua Cabe Return	Will	ABC Movie of the Week
1975	The Wonderful World of Disney	Will MacDonald	2 episodes
1975	S.W.A.T.	Greg Colby	Episode: "Criss-Cross"
1975	Matt Helm	Purcell	Episode: "Think Murder"
1976	Starsky & Hutch	Father Ignatius	Episode: "Silence"
1976	Police Story	Chief Elliott	Episode: "Open City"
1976	Brink's: The Great Robbery	Paul Jackson	Television movie
1976	Jigsaw John		Episode: "Plastique"
1977	Most Wanted	Hill	Episode: "The Hit Men"
1977	Quincy, M.E.	Attorney Paul Barkley	Episode: "Hit and Run at Danny's"
1977	The Hardy Boys/Nancy Drew Mysteries	Alex Richmond	Episode: "A Haunting We Will Go"
1977	Kingston: Confidential	Chaplain Potter	Episode: "The Cult", (final appearance)

== Awards and nominations ==
Year	Award	Category	Nominated work	Result
1969	Golden Globe Awards	Best TV Star – Male	Judd, for the Defense	Won
1969	Primetime Emmy Awards	Outstanding Continued Performance by an Actor in a Leading Role in a Dramatic Series	Judd, for the Defense	Won
