= Johnny Loves Me =

Single by Shelley Fabares

from the album The Things We Did Last Summer
- B-side: "I'm Growing Up"
- Released: May 1962
- Recorded: 1962
- Genre: Pop
- Length: 2:21
- Label: Colpix
- Songwriter(s): Cynthia Weil, Barry Mann
- Producer(s): Stu Phillips

Shelley Fabares singles chronology
"What Did They Do Before Rock 'n' Roll" (1962)	"Johnny Loves Me" (1962)	"The Things We Did Last Summer" (1962)

"Johnny Loves Me" is a pop single by Shelley Fabares released in 1962 on Colpix Records. It was the first single taken from her second album, The Things We Did Last Summer. "Johnny Loves Me" was a collaboration written by Barry Mann and Cynthia Weil. The single was produced and arranged by Stu Phillips.

== Reception ==
The single peaked at number 21 on the Billboard Hot 100 chart in July 1962. It also charted at number 7 on the Adult Contemporary Chart. It is the sequel to her number one hit "Johnny Angel" that charted three months earlier.

== Track listing ==
1. "Johnny Loves Me" - 2:21
2. "I'm Growing Up" - 2:13

== Chart performance ==
Chart (1962)	Peak position
U.S. Billboard Hot 100	21
U.S. Adult Contemporary Chart	7
