= My Dad =

Single by Paul Petersen

from the album My Dad
- B-side: "Little Boy Sad"
- Released: October 1962
- Genre: Pop
- Length: 2:20
- Label: Colpix
- Songwriter(s): Barry Mann, Cynthia Weil
- Producer(s): Stu Phillips

Paul Petersen singles chronology
"Lollipops and Roses" (1962)	"My Dad" (1962)	"Amy" (1963)

"My Dad" is a song written by Barry Mann and Cynthia Weil and performed by Paul Petersen. It reached #2 on the adult contemporary chart, #6 on the U.S. pop chart, and #19 on the U.S. R&B chart in 1963. It was featured on his 1963 album, My Dad. In Canada the song reached #5 in December 1962. On the New Zealand lever hit parade chart it reached #7

The song was arranged by Jimmie Haskell and Stu Phillips and produced by Phillips.

== Other versions ==
- Davy Jones released a version of the song on his 1965 album David Jones.
