= Go Limp =

Song by Nina Simone

from the album Nina Simone in Concert
- Released: 1964
- Recorded: New York City, live at Carnegie Hall
- Label: Philips Records
- Songwriter(s): Alex Comfort
- Composer(s): Nina Simone
- Producer(s): Hal Mooney

"Go Limp" is the penultimate track on Nina Simone's 1964 album Nina Simone in Concert, and is an adaptation of a protest song originally written by Alex Comfort during his involvement with the Campaign for Nuclear Disarmament.

The melody and part of the chorus is taken from the folk ballad "Sweet Betsy from Pike".

== Adaptation ==
In adapting Comfort's lyrics for In Concert, Simone made only minor alterations of Comfort's lyrics to re-situate "Go Limp" within the frame of the civil rights movement. Crucially, Simone replaces the acronym "CND" with "NAACP" in the second line of the first verse, in which the mother first appeals to her daughter. Thus, "Daughter, dear daughter take warning from me/Now don't you go marching with the young CND" becomes "Daughter, dear daughter take warning from me/Now don't you go marching with the NAACP." In both versions, however, the concluding lines of the first verse remain the same: "For they'll rock you and roll you and shove you into bed/and if they steal your nuclear secret, you'll wish you were dead."

== Content and Interpretation ==
Framed as a dialogue between a mother and daughter, "Go Limp" ostensibly warns against the sexual consequences of a young woman's involvement in civil rights organizing. Initially assuring her mother that she will "go on that march and return a virgin maid," the song's protagonist nevertheless succumbs to the advances of "a young man… with a beard on his cheek and a gleam in his eye." Forgetting the "brick in her handbag" that she carried with her to "shed off disgrace," the young woman instead takes a cue from her nonviolence training when her suitor "[suggests] it was time she was kissed." She chooses not to resist, and instead she allows herself to "go limp, and be carried away." At the end of the song, the protagonist assures her mother that "though a baby there be" (and that the father "has left his name and address"), if the civil rights movement is ultimately successful, the child "won't have to march like his da-da and me."

== Performance ==
In both Nina Simone in Concert and during a 1965 performance at the Mickey Theater in the Netherlands, Simone performs "Go Limp" and "Mississippi Goddam" together to close the set. In the latter performance, Simone remarks:

"The next two are the last two, and the first one is called 'Go Limp'—and when we get to the middle of it, I'm going to talk to you again, and see how you feel about joining me. We'll see how the atmosphere feels by then. And then we'll end with 'Mississippi Goddam', which, of course, has no explanation."

Both performances of "Go Limp" involve interaction between the artist and her audience. Simone speeds up or slows down her playing at moments when the audience is invited to laugh, provides frequent asides remarking on the song's absurdity, "forgets" the song's verses, and offers a wide range of gestural cues: gazing off into the distance, pursing her lips to conceal a smile, holding back a laugh with tensed shoulders, casting a knowing look to the band, hiding her face in awkwardness, or leaning back in laughter. Notably, Simone forgets a verse in both the In Concert and the 1965 the Netherlands' recordings, and in each case cues this moment with the question "I told you about momma, didn't I?".

Additionally, in between each verse of "Go Limp," Simone invites the audience to sing along with the song's nonsensical chorus: "Singing too-ra-li, too-ra-li, too-ra-li-ay." For example: in between the first chorus and second verse of the version of the song on In Concert, Simone remarks "You get the gist of the song now? When we get to the chorus again I expect you to sing with lust."

== Criticism ==
Historian Ruth Feldstein claims that in her adaptation of "Go Limp", "Simone mocked, but did not quite reject, the value of passive nonresistance as a means to improve race relations."

Author Nadine Cohades describes "Go Limp" as a "sing-along folk song and a benign if mischievous tribute to the young protesters,"
