= Decision (TV series) =

American television anthology series

- Genre: Anthology series
- Country of origin: United States
- Original language: English
- No. of seasons: 1
- No. of episodes: 13

Production
- Running time: 30 minutes

Original release
- Network: NBC
- Release: July 6 – September 28, 1958

Decision is an American anthology television series that aired on NBC in 1958 as a summer replacement for The Loretta Young Show.

== Content and production ==
Six episodes of Decision were repeats of episodes previously aired on other anthology series. The other seven episodes were unsold television pilots. Episodes starred William Bendix, Dennis Hopper, Richard Kiley, June Lockhart, Darren McGavin, Ray Milland, Barbara Stanwyck, Rod Steiger, and James Whitmore, among many others. Directors included Lamont Johnson, Lewis Allen, David Lowell Rich, and Fred Zinneman. The fifth episode, "Sudden Silence," was produced by Screen Gems.

Decision′s premiere episode was the pilot for a television adaptation of the Owen Wister novel The Virginian, starring James Drury. Although the pilot broadcast on Decision in 1958 went unsold, Drury later starred in a different and very successful television adaptation of Wister's novel, also titled The Virginian, which aired from 1962 to 1971.

Decision′s final episode, referred to both as "Man on a Raft" and "Three Men on a Raft," was an unsuccessful pilot for a proposed series to be named Michael Shayne, starring Mark Stevens as Michael Shayne. However, a 32-episode series named Michael Shayne starring Richard Denning in the title role aired during the 1960–1961 season.

== Broadcast history ==
Decision was broadcast from 10:00 to 10:30 p.m. Eastern Time on Sundays. It premiered on July 6, 1958, and ran for 13 weeks. Its last broadcast was on September 28, 1958.

== Episodes ==
No.	Title	Directed by	Written by	Original release date
1	"The Virginian"	Lamont Johnson	Leslie Stevens	July 6, 1958
Judge Henry asks a man known as "The Virginian" to investigate mysterious setbacks in his efforts to bring a railroad spur to his ranch. Only the ranch's cook, Dora, is helpful to the Virginian, whose investigation brings the judge's disgruntled son, the ranch foreman, and some of the ranch hands under suspicion. Starring James Drury, Andrew Duggan, Stephen Joyce, Robert Burton, Jeanette Nolan, Robert Gist, and Dan Blocker. An unsold pilot for a television adaptation of Owen Wister′s novel The Virginian; a different adaptation, also starring Drury, later led to the successful series The Virginian of 1962–1971.
2	"Fifty Beautiful Girls"	Unknown	Unknown	July 13, 1958
After a serial killer begins strangling taxi dancers, an attractive dancer begins to receive threatening letters and telephone calls. She worries that she will be the next murder victim, but continues to dance in an effort to identify the killer. Starring Barbara Bel Geddes, Edward Andrews, and Royal Dano. This episode previously aired as an episode of Schlitz Playhouse of Stars on June 21, 1957.
3	"The Danger Game"	Unknown	Unknown	July 20, 1958
After an American secret agent is sent to East Asia to pose as a singer while protecting an American missile expert, he tries to uncover an assassination plot. An unsold pilot from the William Morris Agency starring Ray Danton.
4	"The Tall Man"	Thomas Carr	Aaron Spelling	July 27, 1958
Colonel T. J. Allen, a former military officer working as a private investigator in St. Louis, Missouri, in 1869, and his former orderly, now his assistant, head to Texas to recover US$50,000 stolen from a train by the murderous Dawson Gang, who killed the train's three-man crew. Posing as a railroad land-purchasing agent and a store clerk, Allen and his orderly trick Frank Dawson's relatives into revealing his whereabouts. They recover the money and take the gang members to Clayton City to face trial, foiling an escape attempt by one of the gang members and defending them from a mob of vigilantes along the way. An unsold pilot starring Michael Rennie, William Phipps, Henry Brandon, Harry Dean Stanton, Baynes Barron, Jean Willes, Ellen Corby, John Cliff, I. Stanford Jolley, Jack Reitzen, Earle Hodgins, Annette Warren, Hank Mann, Kansas Moehring, and Tex Palmer. Some sources claim the plot involves Allen investigating the mysterious death of a child and a man becoming a suspect in the death, although no such plot appears in the episode.
5	"Sudden Silence"	Lewis Allen	Larry Marcus	August 3, 1958
The Eastern-born wife of a United States marshal, left alone on the 19th-century American frontier to care for her seriously ill, fever-ridden son while her husband is away, is confronted by a vengeful, half-crazed outlaw who has come to kill her husband. Starring Barbara Stanwyck, Jimmy Baird, Jeff Morrow, Trevor Bardette, Jim Hayward, Ralph Dumke, Charlotte Knight, Robert Easton, and Malcolm Atterbury. This episode previously aired as an episode of The Ford Television Theatre on October 10, 1956.
6	"Indemnity"	Unknown	Milton Gelman & Stedman Coles	August 10, 1958
While one of its three guards is eating lunch at a roadside diner, an armored truck containing a US$250,000 payroll disappears along with its other two guards, and insurance fraud expert Paul Scott sets out to recover the missing money. An unsold pilot starring Richard Kiley, Chuck Webster, George Chandler, Ruth Lee, Michael Healy, Jan Saint, John Kellins, and Skip Fletcher.
7	"Stand and Deliver"	Unknown	Unknown	August 17, 1958
A highwayman becomes a gallant champion of righteousness when he saves a young boy from being hanged in 18th-century London. An unsold pilot starring Louis Hayward.
8	"Night of the Stranger"	Lewis Allen	Story by : William Heuman; Teleplay by : Lawrence B. Marcus	August 24, 1958
Pursued by a giant, homicidal mental patient, a woman psychiatrist takes refuge in the nearest house, whose sole occupant – a stranger to her – is a drowsy man who has just taken two sleeping pills. They battle to keep the crazed patient from breaking into the house. Starring George Sanders, Valentina Cortesa, and Mike Lane. This episode previously aired as an episode of Schlitz Playhouse of Stars on March 7, 1958.
9	"Fear Has Many Faces"	Oscar Rudolph	Story by : Joseph Ruscoll and Janet Ruscoll; Teleplay by : Russell S. Hughes	August 31, 1958
After being forced to shoot and kill another soldier who tried to flee to the rear during the Korean War, a police sergeant named Cockran finds it impossible to forget the experience even after he returns to civilian life – and when he begins to receive telephone calls from someone claiming to be the dead man, he is driven to the verge of collapse despite his wife's efforts to console him. Starring James Whitmore, June Lockhart, and Don Haggerty. This episode previously aired as an episode of The Ford Television Theatre on January 2, 1957.
10	"High Air"	Allan Dwan	A. I. Bezzerides	September 7, 1958
A veteran "sandhog" tries to keep his son from working with him to dig a tunnel under the Hudson River and – aware of the dangers of working in highly compressed air — makes a tremendous sacrifice to protect the boy. Based on a story by Borden Chase and starring William Bendix, Dennis Hopper, and John Alderson. This episode previously aired as an episode of Screen Directors Playhouse on September 12, 1956.
11	"Markheim"	Fred Zinneman	John McGreevey & Paul Osborn	September 14, 1958
When a once-wealthy but now degraded and prideless man named Markheim tries to sell his possessions on Christmas Day to recover the money he lost in business, the buyer becomes insulting. Markheim responds by murdering the would-be buyer and attempting to rob the corpse – until a mysterious stranger approaches with a strange and tempting proposition that leads to a battle between good and evil. Based on a story by Robert Louis Stevenson. Starring Ray Milland, Rod Steiger, Jay Novello, Rex Evans, and Marilee Phelps. This episode previously aired as an episode of Screen Directors Playhouse on April 11, 1956.
12	"Man Against Crime"	Richard Bare	Unknown	September 21, 1958
After a gang war breaks out, lawyer Dan Garrett defends a youth accused of killing a young punk. Starring Darren McGavin, David Opatoshu, Stanley Peck, Joe Sullivan, and Terry Greene. This was an unsold pilot for a new series starring McGavin called Man Against Crime that would have been a remake of an earlier series that aired from 1949 to 1954 starring Ralph Bellamy and also called Man Against Crime.
13	"Man on a Raft"	Paul Stewart	Steve Fisher	September 28, 1958
Also referred to as "Three Men on a Raft." An attractive woman named Ann Conway hires private detective Michael Shayne to investigate the details of her playboy husband's death on a boat at sea because a large inheritance depends on the exact date of his demise – and Shayne finds that the facts of the case are not as they have been presented. An unsold pilot for the proposed series Michael Shayne based on a story by Brett Halliday starring Mark Stevens, Diane Brewster, Robert Brubaker, Merry Anders, Steven Mitchell, William Kendis, Mary Adams, Gage Clarke, Bob Stevenson, and Sherwood Price.
