= Nina Simone at Carnegie Hall =

Live album by Nina Simone
- Released: 1963
- Recorded: April 12, 1963
- Venue: Carnegie Hall, New York City
- Genre: Vocal, jazz, blues, folk
- Length: 35:43
- Label: Colpix
- Producer: Jack Lewis

Nina Simone chronology
Nina’s Choice (1963)	Nina Simone at Carnegie Hall (1963)	Folksy Nina (1964)

Nina Simone at Carnegie Hall is a 1963 album by jazz singer/pianist/songwriter Nina Simone. It is a live album recorded at Simone's first solo appearance at Carnegie Hall in New York City, on April 12, 1963, and was released on Colpix Records. The recording was made by Richard Alderson, who had previously recorded the album Nina Simone at The Village Gate, and who also worked as Nina Simone's live sound engineer during this period.

== Track listing ==
No.	Title	Writer(s)	Length
1.	"Black Swan"	Gian Carlo Menotti	6:13
2.	"Theme from Samson and Delilah" (Instrumental)	Camille Saint-Saëns	5:50
3.	"If You Knew"	Nina Simone	3:35
4.	"Theme from Sayonara" (Instrumental)	Irving Berlin	2:25
5.	"The Twelfth of Never"	Jerry Livingston (m), Paul Francis Webster (l)	3:20
6.	"Will I Find My Love Today"	Alex Fogarty (m), Sidney Shaw (l)	6:55
7.	"The Other Woman/Cotton-Eyed Joe"	Jessie Mae Robinson, Nina Simone/Traditional	7:25
Total length:			35:43

=== 2005 2-CD set ===
A 2-CD set was issued in 2005 which combines the original Carnegie Hall album (disc 1) with another album recorded at the same concert, Folksy Nina, plus bonus tracks.

Disc One
No.	Title	Writer(s)	Length
1.	"Black Swan"	Gian Carlo Menotti
2.	"Theme from Samson and Delilah" (Instrumental)	Camille Saint-Saëns
3.	"If You Knew"	Nina Simone
4.	"Theme from Sayonara" (Instrumental)	Irving Berlin
5.	"The Twelfth of Never"	Jerry Livingston (m), Paul Francis Webster (l)
6.	"Will I Find My Love Today"	Alex Fogarty (m), Sidney Shaw (l)
7.	"The Other Woman/Cotton-Eyed Joe"	Jessie Mae Robinson, Nina Simone/Traditional
8.	"Work Song" (Bonus Track)	Nat Adderley

Disc Two
No.	Title	Writer(s)	Length
1.	"Silver City Bound"	Alan Lomax, Huddie Ledbetter, John A. Lomax
2.	"When I Was a Young Girl"	Sebastian "Billy" Mure
3.	"Eratz Zavat Chalav U'dvash"	Eliahu Gamliel
4.	"Lass of the Low Country"	Traditional; arranged by Nina Simone
5.	"The Young Knight"	Charles Kingsley, Joseph Hathaway
6.	"Vaynikehu" (also known as "Israeli Song In 5/4 Time")	Gil Aldema
7.	"Mighty Lak' a Rose"	Ethelbert Nevin, Frank Stanton
8.	"Hush Little Baby"	Traditional
9.	"Little Liza Jane" (Bonus Track)	Traditional
10.	"Will I Find a Resting Place?" (Bonus Track)	Traditional
11.	"Blackbird" (Bonus Track)	Herbert Sacker, Nina Simone

== Personnel ==
- Nina Simone – vocals, piano
- Alvin Schackman, Phil Orlando – guitar
- Lisle Atkinson – bass
- Montego Joe (Roger Sanders) – drums
- The Malcolm Dodds Singers – backing vocals
