= Charlotte Knight =

Charlotte Knight may refer to:

- Charlotte Knight (horticulturalist)
- Charlotte Knight (actress)

== See also ==
- Charlotte Knights, baseball team
