= Folksy Nina =

Live album by Nina Simone
- Released: 1964
- Recorded: April 12, 1963
- Genre: Vocal, jazz, blues, folk
- Length: 40:21
- Label: Colpix
- Producer: Jack Lewis

Nina Simone chronology
Nina Simone at Carnegie Hall (1963)	Folksy Nina (1964)	Nina Simone with Strings (1966)

Folksy Nina is an album by singer/pianist/songwriter Nina Simone. It includes live tracks recorded on April 12, 1963, at Carnegie Hall. The previous album, Nina Simone at Carnegie Hall (1963) uses songs from the same concert. It was released on Colpix Records. In 2005 the "complete" 1963 Carnegie Hall concert was released.

== Track listing ==
No.	Title	Writer(s)	Length
1.	"Silver City Bound"	Huddie Ledbetter, Alan Lomax	5:08
2.	"When I Was a Young Girl"	Sebastian Mure	5:57
3.	"Erets Zavat Chalav"	Eliahu Gamaliel	4:25
4.	"Lass of the Low Country"	Traditional	6:15
5.	"The Young Knight"	Joseph Hathaway, Charles Kingsly	5:25
6.	"The Twelfth of Never"	Jerry Livingston, Paul Francis Webster	3:33
7.	"Vanetihu"	Gil Aldema	2:27
8.	"You Can Sing a Rainbow"	Arthur Hamilton	3:04
9.	"Hush Little Baby"	Pete Seeger	4:07
Total length:			40:21

Remark: Track 8 is sometimes listed as "Mighty Lak' a Rose" (music by Ethelbert Nevin, lyrics by Frank Lebby Stanton). "When I Was a Young Girl" was later covered by Julie Driscoll (as "When I was Young") on her 1969 album Streetnoise, under the assumption it was a traditional tune.
