= The Things We Did Last Summer =

1946 American song

"The Things We Did Last Summer" is a popular song about nostalgia from 1946. The words were written by Sammy Cahn, with the composition by Jule Styne. The most well known version is the 1946 Top ten hit by Jo Stafford. Versions by Frank Sinatra and by Vaughn Monroe also charted that year. Shelley Fabares had a hit cover in 1962 on the pop chart. Several recordings have been made, including versions by Frank Sinatra, Vaughn Monroe, and Dean Martin who recorded different versions for his 1959 and 1966 Christmas LPs.

== Jo Stafford version ==
"The Things We Did Last Summer"

Single by Jo Stafford
- Released: 1946
- Recorded: 1946
- Genre: Traditional Pop
- Length: 3:02
- Label: Capitol
- Songwriters: Sammy Cahn, Jule Styne

Jo Stafford singles chronology
"You Keep Coming Back Like A Song" (1946)	"The Things We Did Last Summer" (1946)	"White Christmas" (1946)

"The Things We Did Last Summer" was recorded by Jo Stafford, in a single released in 1946 on the Capitol Records label. Stafford's version of the song was a successful hit, peaking, at number 10 on the Billboard chart in the United States. Her recording of the song was conducted and arranged by Paul Weston and his Orchestra.

=== Chart performance ===
Chart (1946)	Peak position
U.S. Billboard	10

== Shelley Fabares version ==
"The Things We Did Last Summer"

Single by Shelley Fabares

from the album The Things We Did Last Summer
- B-side: "Breaking Up is Hard to Do"
- Released: August 1962
- Recorded: 1962
- Genre: Pop
- Length: 2:27
- Label: Colpix
- Songwriters: Sammy Cahn, Jule Styne
- Producer: Stu Phillips

Shelley Fabares singles chronology
"Johnny Loves Me" (1962)	"The Things We Did Last Summer" (1962)	"Telephone (Won't You Ring)" (1962)

Shelley Fabares recorded the song in a single released in August 1962 on the Colpix label. It was the second single taken from her second album The Things We Did Last Summer. It was produced and arranged by Stu Phillips.

=== Reception ===
"The Things We Did Last Summer" charted at number 46 on the Billboard Hot 100 chart.

=== Track listing ===
1. "The Things We Did Last Summer" – 2:27
2. "Breaking Up is Hard to Do" – 2:05

=== Chart performance ===
Chart (1962)	Peak position
U.S. Billboard Hot 100	46

== Other versions ==
- The Beach Boys – Good Vibrations: Thirty Years of The Beach Boys (1993)
- Bing Crosby – recorded August 1, 1946 with Jimmy Dorsey and His Orchestra.
- Vic Damone – This Game of Love (1959)
- Sammy Davis Jr. and Carmen McRae - Boy Meets Girl (1957)
- Dick Farney – Noite (1981)
- Michael Feinstein – Michael Feinstein Sings the Jule Styne Songbook (1991)
- A Fine Frenzy – His Songs, Our Way (2009)
- The Four Lads – On the Sunny Side (1956)
- Richard "Groove" Holmes – Soul Message (1965)
- Ramon Jacinto – Romancing RJ (2016)
- Beverly Kenney – Snuggled on Your Shoulder (2006)
- Lesley Gore – My Town, My Guy & Me (1965)
- The Lettermen – More Hit Sounds of the Lettermen (1966)
- Dean Martin – A Winter Romance (1959) and The Dean Martin Christmas Album (1966)
- Herbie Mann – Herbie Mann Plays (1956)
- Helen Merrill – Merrill at Midnight (1957)
- Fats Navarro – Jazz at the Philharmonic, Carnegie Hall (1949)
- Freddie Redd – Piano: East/West (1955)
- George Shearing & Nancy Wilson – The Swingin's Mutual! (1961)
- Sahib Shihab – The Jazz We Heard Last Summer (1957)
- Frank Sinatra – recorded on July 24, 1946 for Columbia Records.
