= Lollipops and Roses =

Lollipops and Roses may refer to:

- "Lollipops and Roses" (song), 1962 popular song composed by Tony Velona, recorded by Jack Jones, and others
- Lollipops and Roses (album), debut studio album recorded in 1962 by Paul Peterson
