= Two for the Money =

Two for the Money may refer to:

- Two for the Money (2005 film), a 2005 American sports-drama film
- Two for the Money (1972 film), a 1972 American TV film
- Two for the Money (game show), an American game show, 1952–1957
- "Two for the Money", a 2008 episode of the American sitcom According to Jim
