= Our Town (Producers' Showcase) =

- Producers' Showcase episode
- Episode no.: Season 2 Episode 1
- Directed by: Delbert Mann
- Written by: David Shaw (adaptation); Thornton Wilder (play)
- Original air date: September 19, 1955
- Running time: 90 minutes

Guest appearances
- Frank Sinatra; Paul Newman; Eva Marie Saint; Shelley Fabares; Paul Hartman

"Our Town" is a 1955 episode of the American anthology series Producers' Showcase directed by Delbert Mann and starring Frank Sinatra, Paul Newman and Eva Marie Saint. Sinatra plays the stage manager and Paul Newman and Eva Marie Saint portray the teenagers who fall in love and get married. The episode is a musical adaptation of Thornton Wilder's 1938 play Our Town, with songs by Jimmy van Heusen and Sammy Cahn, mostly sung by Sinatra the stage manager between and during scenes from the play, and including a duet with Paul Newman and Eva Marie Saint. The 90-minute show was Sinatra's only performance in a dramatic role specifically for television until Contract on Cherry Street in 1977.

== Production ==
Frank Sinatra wears a suit and tie during the live broadcast, and intermittently dons a cocked fedora during the show. This is the only time Paul Newman and Sinatra headlined together in a narrative production. Newman and Eva Marie Saint would subsequently lead the cast of Exodus together in 1960.

All episodes of Producers' Showcase were broadcast in full color although only black and white kinescopes remain for most of the shows, including "Our Town" as well as a 90-minute version of '"The Petrified Forest" starring Humphrey Bogart, Henry Fonda and Lauren Bacall.

== Reception ==
The show was praised by television critics, although several writers have questioned Sinatra's suitability for the role of the Stage Manager. Thornton Wilder reportedly disliked the production.

== Cast ==
- Frank Sinatra as Stage Manager
- Paul Newman as George Gibbs
- Eva Marie Saint as Emily Webb
- Shelley Fabares as Rebecca Gibbs
- Sylvia Field as Mrs. Gibbs
- Paul Hartman as Mr. Webb
- Peg Hillias as Mrs. Webb
- Harvey B. Dunn
- Charlotte Knight
- David Saber
- Ernest Truex as Dr. Gibbs
- Carol Veazie as Mrs. Soames
- Anthony Sydes

== Soundtrack ==
This television production marked the beginning of the lengthy and successful collaboration between Cahn and Van Heusen. Among their songs for the production was "Love and Marriage", later known as the theme song to the TV show Married... with Children. Sinatra's version of the song from the program became a chart success, as did another version quickly recorded by Dinah Shore. The show was also Nelson Riddle's first time to take charge as conductor of an entire television production.
