= Deadly Relations =

- Genre: Crime; Thriller; Drama
- Written by: Dennis Nemec
- Directed by: Bill Condon
- Starring: Robert Urich; Shelley Fabares; Gwyneth Paltrow
- Theme music composer: Philip Giffin
- Country of origin: United States
- Original language: English

Production
- Producers: Ed Milkovich; Dennis Nemec
- Production location: Atlanta, Georgia
- Cinematography: Stephen M. Katz
- Editor: Virginia Katz
- Running time: 91 minutes
- Production companies: O.T.M.L. Productions; Wilshire Court Productions

Original release
- Network: ABC
- Release: May 22, 1993

Deadly Relations is a 1993 American television film directed by Bill Condon. It stars Robert Urich, Shelley Fabares and Gwyneth Paltrow. The film originally aired on ABC on May 22, 1993.

Deadly Relations is based on the true crime book Deadly Relations: A True Story of Murder in a Suburban Family by Carol Donahue and Shirley Hall. Donahue and Hall are the daughters of Leonard Fagot, a New Orleans attorney whose obsession with controlling his daughters led to him murdering their husbands for hefty insurance pay outs.

== Plot ==
Leonard Fagot has four daughters with whom he is obsessed. He lets them know how he feels about the men they date. And if he disapproves of them, he probably will have them killed to get them out of his daughters' life.

== Cast ==
- Robert Urich as Leonard J. Fagot
- Shelley Fabares as Shirley Fagot
- Gwyneth Paltrow as Carol Ann Fagot Applegarth Holland
- Joy Farmer as Shirley Fagot, Jr.
- Georgia Emelin as Joanne Fagot Westerfield
- Jillian Boyd as Nancy Fagot
- Matthew Perry as George Westerfield
- Tony Higgins as Mike Holland
- Ted Marcoux as Bruce Applegarth
- Roxana Zal as Marty
