= The Gants =

American garage rock band

- Also known as: The Kingsmen
- Origin: Greenwood, Mississippi, United States
- Genres: Garage rock
- Years active: 1963–1967; 2005
- Past members: Sid Herring; Vince Montogomery; Don Wood; Johnny Sanders
- Website: www.thegants.com

The Gants was an American garage rock band that formed in 1964 in Greenwood, Mississippi, in the cultural and geographic Deep South.

== History ==
The Kingsmen – a different band from the Kingsmen that had a major hit with "Louie Louie" in the same time period – began with Sid Herring & Johnny Freeman in 1963 playing R&B covers and the type of instrumentals popularized by The Ventures. The Gants were formed shortly after by Sid Herring (lead vocals and guitar), Johnny Sanders (October 8, 1945 – September 29, 2012; guitar), Vince Montgomery (bass guitar), and Don Wood (December 19, 1949 – May 14, 2011; drums).

Several events combined to push the band from the obscurity of playing other artists' songs at Greenwood, Mississippi dances and into the popular genres of 1960s garage-rock. Freeman dropped out of the Kingsmen because of conflicts with his parents over touring out-of-town. After discussions with Vince Montgomery and Don Wood, Sid Herring replaced Freeman with Johnny Sanders. The band name was changed to The Gants, after a popular brand of shirt with a button-down collar, which is also the French word for "glove". In 1965, The Gants released their first single and album, Road Runner. At the same time, Herring, who resembled Peter Noone of Herman's Hermits, began writing some original songs. In early 1965, The Gants were overheard by a U.S. tour manager and coordinator for The Animals, York Noble, while playing in the Holiday Inn ballroom in Laurel, Mississippi and were chosen to open for that band's Florida tour. This turned out to be a typical development for The Gants — playing the first set for more famous groups — but opportunities were limited with half the band still in high school and the other half in college.

At this point, The Gants had a professional sound and a repertoire of original material and an even larger repertoire of covers, which were reflected in the choice of sides for their first single: (Bo Diddley's) "Road Runner" backed with (Herring's own) "My Baby Don't Care", released on the Statue label in mid-1965. The record showed enough potential for re-release on a major label, Liberty Records, in September, and it gained some modest chart success, reaching #46 in the US and #28 in Australia. Later that year, Liberty released The Gants' first album, Roadrunner. In January 1966 a new single was released, "Little Boy Sad", which included an early use of the talk box later made famous by Joe Walsh and Peter Frampton. The band tried to get Liberty to release their recording of Them's "Gloria" but the label declined. The song later became a hit for The Shadows of Knight.

A definite pattern had been established: The Gants were able to record and make brief tours during vacations, but that was never enough. Radio stations gave up on their records when the band could not get away from their responsibilities at home for promotional appearances. In 1966 and early 1967, several singles and two more albums were released, Gants Galore and Gants Again. None of these releases had significant chart impact. During this period Johnny Sanders had quit and was replaced by Johnny Freeman, for a couple of gigs and a trip to California, which proved fruitless. Then Freeman was replaced again after they returned from California in the summer of 1967, and three of the Gants headed back to Greenwood, leaving Herring in Los Angeles with a job as a staff songwriter for Liberty Records.

Despite their lack of hits, The Gants maintained a minor cult aura within the garage rock ethos and were not entirely forgotten. One of their songs, Herring's "I Wonder" was included on the 1980 compilation album, Pebbles, Volume 8. In 2000, Sundazed Music released Roadrunner! The Best of The Gants, with liner notes by Mike Stax; their single "Little Boy Sad" was included on Oxford American magazine's Southern Sampler music CD.

In 2005, The Gants were performing together again: Sid Herring, Don Wood, Johnny Sanders, (Johnny Freeman rhythm guitar rejoined the band in 2001) with bassist Ed Foresman replacing Vince Montgomery, who died of natural causes in January 2001 at his home in Clarksdale, Mississippi, at age 54.

Don Wood died in his home in Greenwood, Mississippi on May 14, 2011, at age 61.

Johnny Sanders died at home on September 29, 2012, from Alzheimer's Disease, at age 66. He was an MD, and founded Sanders Clinic for Women in Tupelo, MS.

== Discography ==
=== Albums ===
- Road Runner (1965)
- Gants Again (1966)
- Gants Galore (1966)

=== Compilation albums ===
- I Wonder (1988)
- Roadrunner! The Best of The Gants (2000)
- Introducing The Gants (2005)

=== Singles ===
Year	Single	Chart Positions	
Year	Single	US	AU
1965	"Roadrunner" /"My Baby Don't Care"	46	28
1965	"What's Happening" /"Careless"	-	-
1966	"Crackin' Up" /"Dr. Feelgood"	-	-
1966	"I Want Your Lovin'" /"Spoonful of Sugar"	-	-
1966	"(You Can't Blow) Smoke Rings" /"Little Boy Sad"	-	-
1967	"Drifters Sunrise" /"Just a Good Show"	-	-
1967	"Greener Days" /"I Wonder"	-	-
1969	"Another Chance" /"Ain't Too Proud To Beg"	-	-
