= Nina Simone with Strings =

Studio album by Nina Simone
- Released: 1966
- Recorded: 1961–1964, New York City
- Genre: Vocal, jazz, blues, folk
- Label: Colpix 496

Nina Simone chronology
Folksy Nina (1964)	Nina Simone with Strings (1966)	Nina Simone in Concert (1964)

Professional ratings
Review scores
Source	Rating
AllMusic	3/5 stars

Nina Simone with Strings is an album by Nina Simone. After her contract with Colpix Records had expired, the label took unissued recordings by Simone and sweetened them with a string ensemble. The album was released after the singer had left the label.

In the UK, the album's version of "I Loves You Porgy" was used in television commercials in 1997 by the mobile telephone operator Orange.

== Track listing ==
No.	Title	Writer(s)	Length
1.	"I Loves You Porgy"	George Gershwin, Ira Gershwin	4:00
2.	"Blackbird"	Nina Simone	2:06
3.	"Falling in Love Again (Can't Help It)"	Friedrich Hollaender, Sammy Lerner	2:38
4.	"Baubles Bangles and Beads"	Robert Wright, George Forrest	2:04
5.	"Spring Is Here"	Richard Rodgers, Lorenz Hart	2:37
6.	"That's All"	Bob Haymes, Alan Brandt	2:24
7.	"Chain Gang (The Work Song)"	Nat Adderley	2:40
8.	"The Man with a Horn"	Eddie DeLange, Jack Jenney, Bonnie Lake	3:17
9.	"Porgy I Is Your Woman Now (Bess, You is My Woman)"	George Gershwin, Ira Gershwin	3:22
10.	"Gimme a Pigfoot (And a Bottle of Beer)"	Bessie Smith	2:05
