= The Monk (1969 film) =

- Written by: Tony Barrett
- Story by: Blake Edwards
- Directed by: George McCowan
- Starring: George Maharis; Janet Leigh; Jack Albertson; Carl Betz
- Music by: Earle Hagen
- Country of origin: United States
- Original language: English

Production
- Executive producers: Aaron Spelling; Danny Thomas
- Producers: Tony Barrett; Aaron Spelling
- Cinematography: Fleet Southcott
- Editor: Jerry Jameson
- Running time: 74 minutes
- Production company: Thomas-Spelling Productions

Original release
- Network: ABC
- Release: October 21, 1969

The Monk is a 1969 American made-for-television crime thriller film starring George Maharis, Janet Leigh, Jack Albertson and Carl Betz. Originally filmed as a television pilot, it premiered as the ABC Movie of the Week on October 21, 1969. It was directed by George McCowan in his film debut in a project developed by Blake Edwards that had been offered to George Maharis three years previously.

== Plot ==
Underworld attorney Leo Barnes hires Gus Monk to safeguard a valuable envelope containing information on a mobster. Monk refuses — until he meets Leo's wife Janice Barnes and jumps on a merry-go-round of viciousness and murder.

== Main cast ==
Actor	Role
George Maharis	Gus Monk
Janet Leigh	Janice Barnes
Jack Albertson	Tinker
William Smathers	Leo Barnes
Rick Jason	Wideman
Raymond St. Jacques	Heritage
Carl Betz	Gouzenko
Jack Soo	Hip Guy

== Notes ==
- TV Guide (October 18–24, 1969)
