= Mississippi Goddam =

1964 song written and performed by Nina Simone

- The sleeve for the promo release of the single

Song by Nina Simone

from the album Nina Simone in Concert
- Released: 1964
- Recorded: New York City, live at Carnegie Hall
- Label: Philips Records
- Songwriter: Nina Simone
- Composer: Nina Simone
- Producer: Hal Mooney

"Mississippi Goddam" is a song written and performed by American singer and pianist Nina Simone, who later announced the anthem to be her "first civil rights song". Composed in less than an hour, the song emerged in a "rush of fury, hatred, and determination" as she "suddenly realized what it was to be black in America in 1963". The song was released on her album Nina Simone in Concert in 1964, which was based on recordings from three concerts she gave at Carnegie Hall earlier that year. The album was her first release for the Dutch label Philips Records and is indicative of the more political turn her recorded music took during this period.

Together with the songs "Ain't Got No, I Got Life", "Four Women" and "To Be Young, Gifted and Black", "Mississippi Goddam" is one of her most famous protest songs and self-written compositions. In 2019, "Mississippi Goddam" was selected by the Library of Congress for preservation in the National Recording Registry for being "culturally, historically, or aesthetically significant".

== Interpretation ==
The song captures Simone's response to the racially motivated murders of Emmett Till and Medgar Evers in Mississippi, and the 16th Street Baptist Church bombing in Birmingham, Alabama, killing four black children. On the recording, she sarcastically announces the song as "a show tune, but the show hasn't been written for it yet." The song begins jauntily, with a show tune feel, but demonstrates its political focus early on with its refrain: "Alabama's got me so upset, Tennessee's made me lose my rest, and everybody knows about Mississippi goddam." In the song, she says: "They keep on sayin' 'go slow' ... to do things gradually would bring more tragedy. Why don't you see it? Why don't you feel it? I don't know, I don't know. You don't have to live next to me, just give me my equality!"

Simone incorporates several political references in "Mississippi Goddam". In the song, she sings: "Governor Wallace has made me lose my rest," a reference to George Wallace's infamous stand in the schoolhouse door, which saw the former governor of Alabama attempt to block two black students from enrolling in the University of Alabama. She continues: "You told me to wash and clean my ears, and talk real fine just like a lady, and you'd stop calling me Sister Sadie." Sister Sadie, an African-American woman who is portrayed as strong and who doesn’t express her anger or pain, is a character in Mark Twain's novel Adventures of Huckleberry Finn. With lyrics such as "You're just plain rotten" and "You're too damn lazy", Simone mocks her racist oppressors by mimicking their language. Miami University musicology professor Tammy Kernodle explains: "In Mississippi Goddam, we have Nina Simone pulling from the past and invoking it in the present, but also speaking to what is yet to come if America does not enact real social change."

Musically, "Mississippi Goddam" is formally complex, modulating between spoken and sung, switching melodies, changing tempos like a show tune. The upbeat opening sound is reminiscent of the kinds of show numbers that vaudeville audiences would have known. Simone then switches from the major chord to the relative minor. These modulations are also reflected in the song's lyrics. The Carnegie Hall recording includes a number of spoken asides, including "This is a show tune, but the show hasn't been written for it yet." Scholar Jordan Alexander Stein writes "It sounds like a declaration, an explanation, but like everything else in this performance, it is deceptive in its clarity ... Simone offers up a genre (show tune) in which the audience can locate what it is hearing, at the same time that she yanks away any more precise context (the show, which hasn’t been written). Hers is not, however, not an explanation, as genre can itself be a way of saying something."

== Reception ==
Simone first performed the song at the Village Gate nightclub in Greenwich Village, and shortly thereafter in March 1964 at Carnegie Hall, in front of a mostly white audience. The Carnegie Hall recording was subsequently released as a single and became an anthem during the Civil Rights Movement. "Mississippi Goddam" was banned in several Southern states. Boxes of promotional singles sent to radio stations around the country were returned with each record broken in half, leading scholar Daphne Brooks later to dub the song Simone's "legendary cursing anthem".

== Performances ==
Simone performed the song in front of thousands of people at the end of the Selma to Montgomery marches when she and other black activists, including Sammy Davis Jr., James Baldwin and Harry Belafonte, crossed police lines.

Simone performed "Mississippi Goddam" on The Steve Allen Show on September 10, 1964. First Amendment scholar Ronald Collins felt that Steve Allen, the "famed host of a nationally syndicated TV variety program ... was one of the few who then dared to provide a forum for those with dissident views." Therefore, when Nina Simone "joined Allen at the desk before [the] song, he told her he wanted her to sing 'Mississippi Goddam' because he knew it would provoke a lively discussion about censorship."

== Legacy ==
In later performances of "Mississippi Goddam", Simone changed her lyrics to reflect current events. On The Steve Allen Show, she sang "St. Augustine made me lose my rest", referencing a recent Civil Rights protest that took place there. In March 1965, while performing for activists in Montgomery, she changed the second line to “Selma made me lose my rest", referring to a violent confrontation that occurred on the Edmund Pettus bridge between the activists and state and local law enforcement. In 1966, at the Newport Jazz Festival, she changed the line to "Watts made me lose my rest", alluding to the riots that took place in the Watts neighborhood in Los Angeles. After Rev. Dr. Martin Luther King, Jr.’s assassination in Memphis, Simone changed her lyrics accordingly, singing: "Memphis made me lose my rest."

In 2021, "Mississippi Goddam" was listed at number 172 on Rolling Stone magazine's "Top 500 Greatest Songs of All Time". In 2025, the publication ranked the song at number seven on its list of "The 100 Best Protest Songs of All Time". In 2022, American Songwriter ranked the song number three on their list of the 10 greatest Nina Simone songs, and in 2023, The Guardian ranked the song number one on their list of the 20 greatest Nina Simone songs.

In June 2026, CBS News included the song in its list of the 250 essential American songs of the past 250 years.

== See also ==
- Civil rights movement in popular culture
- Protest songs
