= Little Boy Sad =

Single by Johnny Burnette

from the album Johnny Burnette Sings
- B-side: "(I Go) Down to the River"
- Released: January 23, 1961
- Genre: Rock and roll
- Length: 2:01
- Label: Liberty Records 55298
- Songwriter: Wayne Walker
- Producer: Snuff Garrett

Johnny Burnette singles chronology
"You're Sixteen" (1960)	"Little Boy Sad" (1961)	"Big Big World" (1961)

"Little Boy Sad" is a song written by Wayne Walker and performed by Johnny Burnette. The song reached #12 on the UK Singles Chart and #17 on the Billboard Hot 100 in 1961. The song appeared on his 1961 album, Johnny Burnette Sings.

The song was produced by Snuff Garrett.

== Chart history ==
=== Weekly charts ===
Johnny Burnette

Chart (1961)	Peak position
Canada (CHUM Hit Parade)	11
UK	12
U.S. Billboard Hot 100	17
U.S. Cash Box Top 100	19

Bill Phillips

Chart (1969–70)	Peak position
Canada RPM Country	17
US Hot Country Songs (Billboard)	10

== Other versions ==
- Paul Petersen released a version of the song as the B-side to his hit single, "My Dad" in 1962. It was featured on his 1962 album, Lollipops and Roses.
- M.P.D. Limited released a version as a single in Australia in 1965, which reached the Top 10 across the country.
- The Gants released a version as a single in 1966.
- Herman's Hermits released a version on the UK version of their 1966 album, Both Sides of Herman's Hermits.
- Bill Phillips released a version as a single in 1969. It reached #10 on the country chart.
