= Johnny Angel (song) =

1962 single by Shelley Fabares

Single by Shelley Fabares

from the album Shelley!
- B-side: "Where's It Gonna Get Me"
- Released: February 1962
- Recorded: Fall 1961
- Genre: Pop
- Length: 2:19
- Label: Colpix
- Songwriters: Lyn Duddy and Lee Pockriss
- Producer: Stu Phillips

Shelley Fabares singles chronology
| "Johnny Angel" (1962) | "What Did They Do Before Rock 'n' Roll" (1962) |

"Johnny Angel" is a song written and composed by Lyn Duddy and Lee Pockriss. It was originally recorded by both Laurie Loman and Georgia Lee, but those two versions were not successful. It first became a popular hit single when it was recorded by Shelley Fabares in the fall of 1961; she took it to number 1 on the Billboard Hot 100 Chart when the song was released in 1962. In the same year, British singer Patti Lynn had a moderate hit on the UK Singles Chart with her cover of the song. The American pop music duo The Carpenters recorded "Johnny Angel" in 1973 as part of a medley of oldies on side two of their album Now & Then.

== Shelley Fabares version ==
=== Background ===
"Johnny Angel" is the debut pop single by Shelley Fabares. Her cover version was recorded in the fall of 1961, and released in 1962 on the Colpix label. The track was the first single taken from Fabares' debut solo album Shelley!, which was produced and arranged by Stu Phillips.

The single premiered on the fourth season (episode 20, "Donna's Prima Donna") of The Donna Reed Show, the sitcom in which Fabares co-starred. It also has a sequel song entitled "Johnny Loves Me", which tells the story of how the girl won Johnny's heart.

Darlene Love and her group, the Blossoms, sang backup vocals on the track. Fabares is quoted in The Billboard Book of Number One Singles by Fred Bronson as saying she was intimidated by Love's group and their "beautiful" voices and was terrified at the prospect of becoming a recording artist, as she did not consider herself a singer, but was expected to sing on the show anyway. The song also featured an echo chamber, where the intro of the repeated title words: "Johnny Angel, Johnny Angel" was used by Fabares and the backup singers. Musicians who played on the track include Hal Blaine on drums, Carol Kaye on bass and Glen Campbell on guitar.

The song is an expression of a teenage girl's romantic longing for a boy who doesn't know she exists, to the point where she declines other boys' propositions for dates because she would rather concentrate on the boy she loves.

Although Fabares' career as an actress stayed strong for three decades, her career as a singer came to an end within a few years of "Johnny Angel" when she was unable to come up with another Top 20 hit. However, the song has become an oldies radio airplay favorite.

=== Reception ===
"Johnny Angel" hit number 1 on the Billboard Hot 100 on April 7, 1962, during a 15-week run on the chart. It was a number 1 hit on the Top 100 Best Sellers chart in April 1962 as published by Cashbox. It charted number 1 in both Canada (for 3 weeks) and in New Zealand. "Johnny Angel" also peaked at number 41 on the UK Singles chart, where Patti Lynn's recording of the song was a slightly bigger hit. It sold over one-million copies and was awarded a gold disc.

=== Track listings ===
1. "Johnny Angel" - 2:19
2. "Where's It Gonna Get Me" - 2:08

=== Charts ===
==== Weekly charts ====
| Chart (1962) | Peak position |
|---|---|
| Canadian Singles Chart | 1 |
| New Zealand (Lever Hit Parade) | 1 |
| UK Singles (Official Charts) | 41 |
| US Billboard Hot 100 | 1 |
| US Cash Box Top 100 | 1 |

==== Year-end charts ====
| Chart (1962) | Rank |
|---|---|
| US Billboard Hot 100 | 6 |
| US Cash Box Top 100 | 11 |

==== All-time charts ====
| Chart (1958-2018) | Position |
|---|---|
| US Billboard Hot 100 | 569 |

=== In the media ===
- It was featured in the 1990 film Mermaids, the film Andre and the episode "Halloween" in the TV-series My So-Called Life.
- The song was featured in a 1976 episode of Saturday Night Live hosted by Dyan Cannon, where Johnny Angel turns out to be three Hells Angels all named Johnny.
- In the song The Beat of Black Wings, which appears on Joni Mitchell's album Chalk Mark in a Rain Storm, the words Charlie Angel are sung at the end of several lines, in the same style as the Shelley Fabares cover, in an apparent reference to the Fabares version of the song.

== Patti Lynn version ==
"Johnny Angel"

Single by Patti Lynn
- B-side: "Tonight You Belong to Me"
- Released: March 1962
- Recorded: 1962
- Genre: Pop
- Length: 2:16
- Label: Fontana
- Songwriters: Lyn Duddy and Lee Pockriss
- Producer: Harry Robinson

Patti Lynn singles chronology
| "Johnny Angel" (1962) | "Tell Me, Telstar" (1962) |

=== Background ===
British pop singer Patti Lynn released a cover of "Johnny Angel" for the Fontana Records label in March 1962. It was produced by Harry Robinson. Her version charted on the UK Singles Chart at number 37 in May 1962.

=== Track listings ===
1. "Johnny Angel" - 2:16
2. "Tonight You Belong To Me" - 2:12

=== Charts ===
| Chart (1962) | Peak position |
|---|---|
| UK Singles (Official Charts) | 37 |

== The Carpenters version ==
"Johnny Angel"

Song by The Carpenters

from the album Now & Then
- Released: May 16, 1973
- Recorded: 1973
- Genre: Pop
- Length: 1:30
- Label: A&M
- Songwriters: Lyn Duddy and Lee Pockriss
- Producers: Richard and Karen Carpenter

The pop music duo the Carpenters recorded "Johnny Angel" and included it on their fifth studio album Now & Then in May 1973. Richard and Karen Carpenter produced it and was issued on the A&M record label. The song was included on Side "B" of the album as part of an oldies medley.

== Other versions ==
The tune had previously been recorded by Georgia Lee on the Decca label. It was also covered in French by Canadian singer Renée Martel in 1967.
