= Two for the Money (1972 film) =

- Written by: Howard A. Rodman
- Directed by: Bernard L. Kowalski
- Starring: Robert Hooks; Stephen Brooks; Cathy Burns; T. K. Carter; Franklyn Seales
- Music by: Paul Glass
- Country of origin: United States
- Original language: English

Production
- Producer: Aaron Spelling
- Cinematography: Archie R. Dalzell
- Editor: Art Seid
- Running time: 73 minutes
- Production company: Aaron Spelling Productions

Original release
- Release: February 26, 1972

Two for the Money is a 1972 American TV film that began as an Aaron Spelling television pilot. It premiered on February 26, 1972 as an ABC Movie of the Week.

== Plot ==
Two ex-cops starting out as private eyes take their first case: finding a wily young man who murdered a family twelve years earlier and then vanished without a trace.

== Cast ==
- Robert Hooks as Larry Dean
- Stephen Brooks as Chip Bronx
- Walter Brennan as Cody Guilford
- Cathy Burns as Judith Gap
- Neville Brand as Sheriff Harley
- Shelley Fabares as Bethany Hagen
- Anne Revere as Mrs Gap
- Mercedes McCambridge as Mrs Castle
- Richard Dreyfuss as Morris Gap
- Skip Homeier as Doctor
- Michael Fox as Hospital Administrator
- Mady Maguire as Waitress
