= Paul Petersen =

American actor, singer and writer (born 1945)

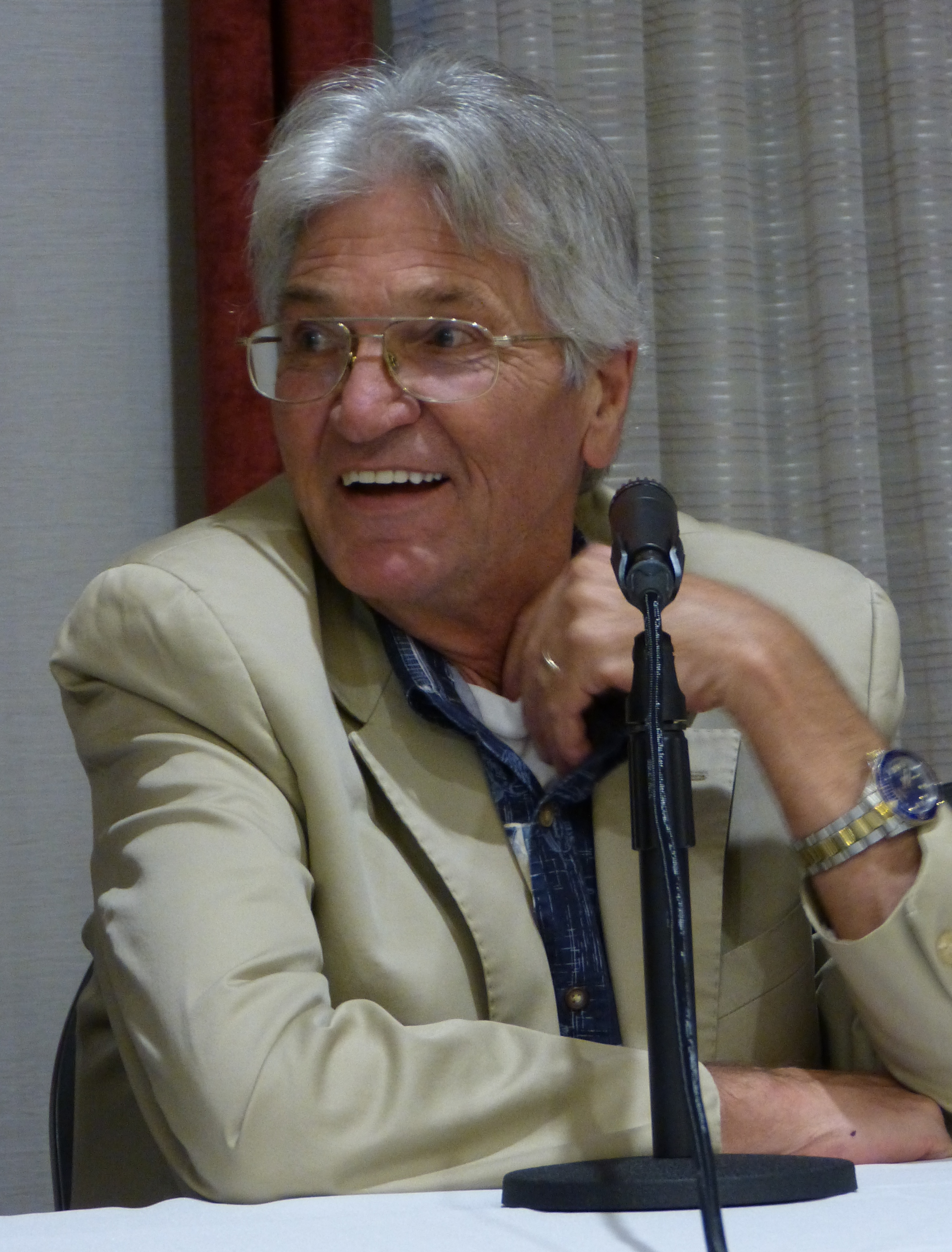
- Petersen in 2015
- Born: September 23, 1945 (age 80)
- Occupations: Actor; singer; writer; activist
- Years active: 1955–present
- Spouses: Brenda Benet (m. 1967; div. 1970) Hallie Litman (m. 1974; div. 1988) Rana Jo Platz (m. 1992)
- Children: 3
- Relatives: Patty Petersen (sister)
- Website: paulpetersen.com aminorconsideration.org

Paul Petersen (born September 23, 1945) is an American actor, singer, novelist and activist.

He rose to prominence in the 1950s playing Jeff Stone on The Donna Reed Show. Petersen pursued a singing career in the 1960s. In the 1980s and 1990s, he had a recurring role on Matt Houston and played author Paul Conway in the film Mommy's Day.

In 1990, Petersen established the organization A Minor Consideration to support child stars and other child laborers through legislation, family education, and personal intervention and counseling for those in crisis.

== Career ==
=== Acting ===
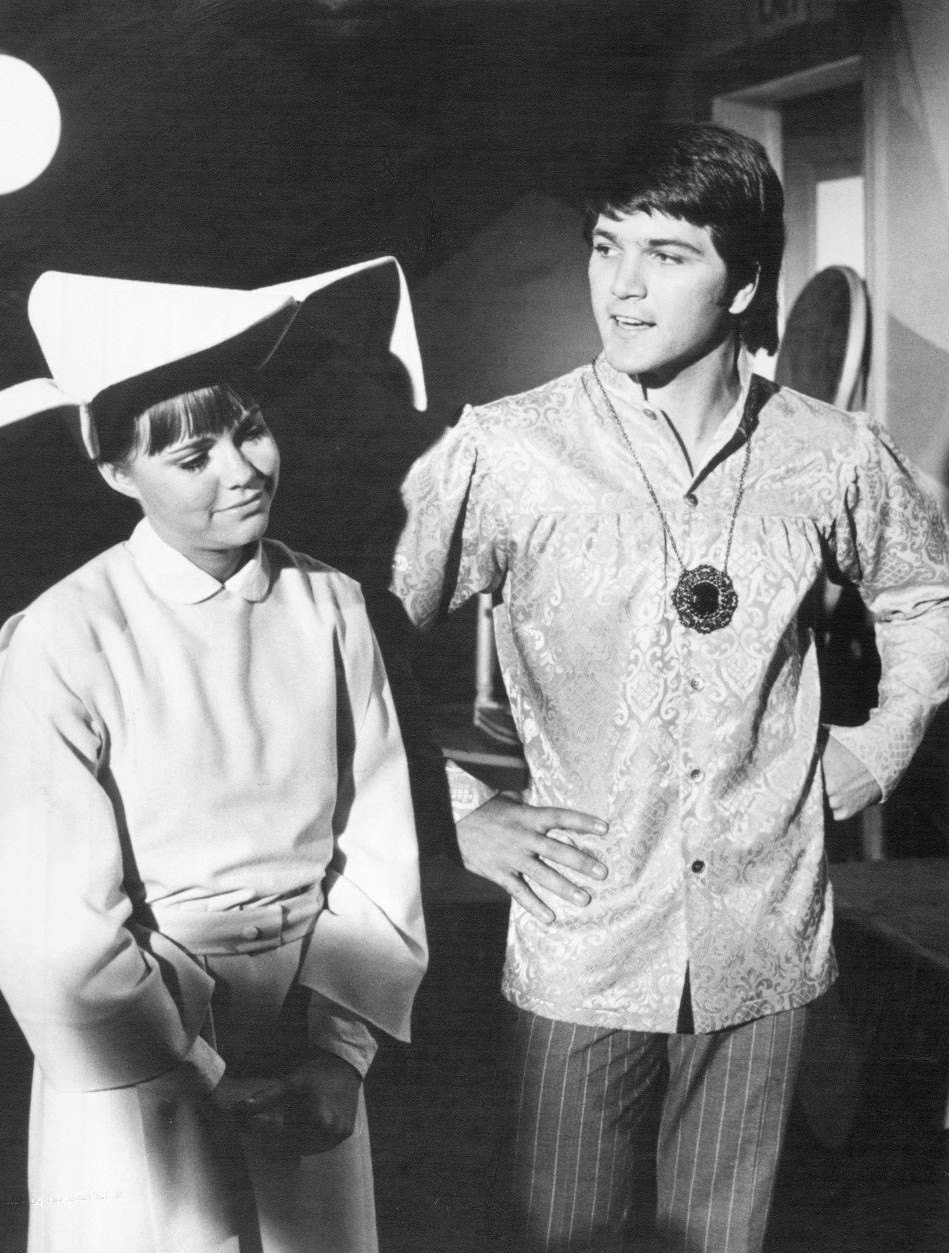
Petersen with Sally Field in The Flying Nun, 1968

Petersen began his show business career at age 10 as a Mouseketeer on the Mickey Mouse Club. He appeared in the 1958 movie Houseboat with Sophia Loren and Cary Grant, but achieved stardom playing teenager Jeff Stone from 1958 to 1966 on the ABC family television sitcom The Donna Reed Show. Throughout eight seasons and decades of reruns in syndication, The Donna Reed Show became part of American popular culture, and in 1997, Petersen was honored by the Young Artist Foundation with its Former Child Star "Lifetime Achievement" Award for his role on the series.

After The Donna Reed Show ended, Petersen had a small role as Tony Biddle in the 1967 musical film The Happiest Millionaire. He also appeared in many guest roles, including one as a military officer in the short-lived 1967 ABC Western series Custer, with Wayne Maunder in the title role. He also made a guest appearance on F Troop as "Johnny Eagle Eye" that aired on April 12, 1966.

=== Singing ===
With the fame he achieved on The Donna Reed Show, Petersen received recording offers and had hit record singles with the songs "She Can't Find Her Keys" (also introduced on The Donna Reed Show), "Amy", and "Lollipops and Roses". In 1962, the sentimental teen pop song "My Dad" was performed on The Donna Reed Show with Petersen singing the tune to his on-screen father, actor Carl Betz. Released as a single in the same year, it reached number six on the Billboard Hot 100 chart. He also recorded for Motown/Tamla throughout the 1960s releasing such singles as "Chained" and "A Little Bit For Sandy".

=== Writing ===
After his years as a child actor, Petersen attended college. He went on to write 16 adventure novels. Petersen's authorship began after he met David Oliphant, a New York City publisher visiting Los Angeles. His first novel concerned car racing. Thereafter, he created a Matt Helm-type hero, Eric Saveman, also known as "The Smuggler". In one year, Pocket Books published eight of his Smuggler novels, earning $75,000 for Peterson. In 1977, Petersen's autobiography entitled Walt, Mickey and Me: Confessions of the First Ex-Mouseketeer was published.

=== Other ventures ===
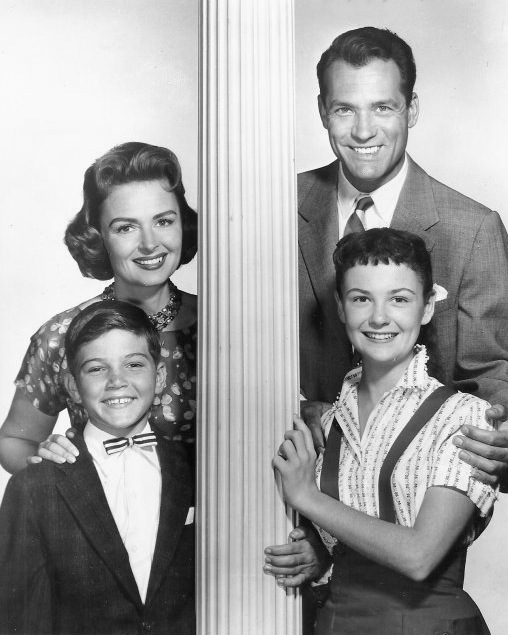
Petersen with The Donna Reed Show co-stars (L–R) Donna Reed, Carl Betz, and Shelley Fabares, 1958

He is a board member of the Donna Reed Foundation and works for the Donna Reed Festival, which takes place annually on the third week of June in Reed's hometown of Denison, Iowa. He also recently served on the board of directors of Screen Actors Guild-American Federation of Television and Radio Artists (SAG-AFTRA), a national media performers AFL-CIO union based in Los Angeles.

=== Activism ===
In 1990, following the suicide of former child star Rusty Hamer, Petersen founded a child-actor support group, A Minor Consideration, to improve working conditions for child actors and to assist in the transition between working as a child actor and adult life, whether in acting or in other professions.

== Personal life ==
Petersen has been married three times. His first marriage was to actress Brenda Benet. They married in 1967 and divorced in 1970. In 1974, he married Hallie Litman with whom he had two children. They divorced in 1988. In December 1992, Petersen married Rana Jo Platz. In addition to his two children from his second marriage, Petersen also has a daughter from a previous relationship.

== Discography ==
=== Studio albums ===
- 1962: Lollipops and Roses — Colpix CP-429/SCP-429
- 1963: Teenage Triangle — Colpix CP-444/SCP-444—No. 48, May 1963

Featuring four tracks each by Paul Petersen, Shelley Fabares, and James Darren

- 1963: My Dad — Colpix CP-442/SCP-442
- 1963: Bye Bye Birdie — Colpix CP-454/SCP-454

Songs from the movie sung by Petersen, The Marcels, James Darren, and Shelley Fabares

- 1964: More Teenage Triangle — Colpix CP-468/SCP-468

Second album featuring Petersen, Fabares, and Darren

=== Singles ===
Year	Titles (A-side, B-side) Both sides from same album except where indicated	Chart Positions		Album
Year	Titles (A-side, B-side) Both sides from same album except where indicated	US	AU	Album
1962	"She Can't Find Her Keys" b/w "Very Unlikely" (with Shelley Fabares) (Non-album track)	19	62	Lollipops and Roses
1962	"What Did They Do Before Rock & Roll" b/w "Very Unlikely" (Non-album track); Both tracks with Shelley Fabares	–	–	Lollipops and Roses
1962	"Keep Your Love Locked (Deep in Your Heart)" b/w "Be Everything to Anyone You Love"	58	–	Lollipops and Roses
1962	"Lollipops and Roses" b/w "Please Mr. Sun"	54	–	Lollipops and Roses
1962	"My Dad" b/w "Little Boy Sad" (from Teenage Triangle)	6	59	My Dad
1963	"Amy" b/w "Goody Goody" (from My Dad)	65	–	Non-album tracks
1963	"Girls in the Summertime" b/w "Mama, Your Little Boy Fell" (from Lollipops and Roses)	–	–	Non-album tracks
1963	"The Cheer Leader" b/w "Polka Dots and Moonbeams"	78	–	Non-album tracks
1964	"She Rides with Me" b/w "Poorest Boy in Town"	–	–	More Teenage Triangle
1964	"Hey There Beautiful" b/w "Where Is She"	–	–	Non-album tracks
1965	"Little Dreamer" b/w "Happy"	–	–	Non-album tracks
1965	"The Ring" b/w "You Don't Need Money"	–	–	Non-album tracks
1967	"Chained" b/w "Don't Let It Happen to Us"	–	–	Non-album tracks
1968	"A Little Bit for Sandy" b/w "Your Love's Got Me Burning Alive"	–	21	Non-album tracks

== Filmography ==
Year	Title	Role	Notes
1957	This Could Be the Night	Joey	Uncredited
1957	The Monolith Monsters	Bobby – Paperboy	Uncredited
1958	Day of the Badman	Little Boy	Uncredited
1958	Houseboat	David Winters	
1958-66	The Donna Reed Show	Jeff Stone	275 episodes
1964	The Virginian	Dan Grant	S2.E24 - "Another's Footsteps"
1966	F Troop	Johnny Eagle Eye	S1.E30 - "Johnny Eagle Eye"
1967	Iron Horse	Frank Wyatt	S2.E10 - "Steel Chain to a Music Box"
1967	A Time for Killing	Blue Lake	
1967	The Happiest Millionaire	Tony	co-produced by Walt Disney
1967	In the Year 2889	Steve Morrow	TV movie
1967	Custer	Lieutenant Cox	S1.E7 - "Suspicion"
1967	Please Don't Eat the Daisies	Jerry	S2.E20 - "None So Righteous"
1968	Journey to Shiloh	J.C. Sutton	
1968	The Flying Nun	Sonny Howard	S2.E1 - "Song of Bertrille"
1968	The Big Valley	Roy Sanders	S4.E8 - "The Long Ride"
1968	Mannix	Dean Devlin	S1.E23 - "To Kill a Writer"
1968	Something for a Lonely Man	Pete Duren	TV film (NBC)
1968-70	Lassie	Billy Cameron/Dave Loka	3 episodes
1969	Gidget Grows Up	Moondoggie	ABC Movie of the Week
1969	My Three Sons	Ted Winks	S10.E9 - "Mexican Honeymoon"
1971	The Smith Family	Allen Williams	S1.E2 - "The Ex-Con"
1971	Love, American Style	Harold	S3.E6 - segment "Love and the Bashful Groom"
1971	O'Hara, U.S. Treasury	Fred Cope	S1.E5 - "Operation: Time Fuse"
1972	Cannon	Pete Farrell	S1.E16 - "Treasure of San Ignacio"
1978	The Next Step Beyond	Mitch	S1.E7 - "Ghost Town"
1979	Fantasy Island	Eugene Bodine	S3.E4 - "Baby/Marathon: Battle of the Sexes"
1980	Scout's Honor	Ace's Dad	TV film (NBC)
1982-85	Matt Houston	Cop/Guard/Policeman/Detective Wilkinson	8 episodes
1982	Strike Force	Jameson/Bluecoat/Officer Daley	3 episodes
1983	High School U.S.A.	The Coach	TV film (NBC)
1984-87	The New Mike Hammer	Clerk/Officer	2 episodes
1985	Trapper John, M.D.	Bailey	S6.E15 - "So Little, Gone"
1985	Finder of Lost Loves	Policeman	S1.E21 - "Final Analysis"
1986	The A-Team	Actor	S5.E12 - "The Grey Team"
1989	Mike Hammer: Murder Takes All	Stanfield	TV film (CBS)
1997	Mommy 2: Mommy's Day	Paul Conway	
1998	Beyond Belief: Fact or Fiction	Gene Avery	S2.E10 - segment "The Card Game"
2003	Dickie Roberts: Former Child Star	Himself	
2010	The Portal	Manager Rick	
2010	Soupernatural	CNN Producer	
