= The Baffled Knight =

Traditional song

"The Baffled Knight" or "Blow Away the Morning Dew" (Roud 11, Child 112) is a traditional ballad existing in numerous variants. The first-known version was published in Thomas Ravenscroft's Deuteromelia (1609) with a matching tune, making this one of the few early ballads for which there is extant original music. The song was included in such notable collections as Pills to Purge Melancholy by Thomas d'Urfey (1719–1720) and Reliques of Ancient English Poetry by Thomas Percy (1765).

Versions were collected in England, Scotland, the US, and Canada. One version was recorded by Cecil Sharp from John Dingle (Coryton, Devon, 12 September 1905).

The "Blow Away the Morning Dew" version was used in the third movement of Ralph Vaughan Williams' English Folk Song Suite (1923). Norfolk fisherman Sam Larner sang this same melody to Ewan MacColl and Peggy Seeger in 1958–60, then was filmed performing the song in 1962.

== Synopsis ==
A knight (or in later versions a farmer's son or a shepherd's son) meets a maid away from house and town, sometimes swimming in a brook. He proposes intimacy. She persuades him that they will be more comfortable upon her richly appointed bed, or that if he brings her to her father's house, she will marry him and bring a rich dowry. When they arrive at her home she goes in first and locks him out; in most variants, once safely inside she taunts him for his gullibility.

The ballad generally includes advice to young men not be put off by maidenly protests when they meet defenceless women;

There is a gude auld proverb,
I've often heard it told,
He that would not when he might,
He should not when he would.

In one variant, he finds her again, and she tricks him by claiming her lover is near, so that he falls into the river, and a third time, in which she pulls his boots halfway off, so he is unable to get them on or off quickly enough to catch her.
