= Shelley Fabares =

American actress and singer (1944–2026)

- Fabares in 1976
- Born: Michele Ann Marie Fabares; January 19, 1944; Santa Monica, California, U.S.
- Died: August 22, 2026 (aged 82); Los Angeles, California, U.S.
- Other name: Shelly Fabares
- Occupations: Actress; singer
- Years active: 1947–2017
- Spouses: Lou Adler (m. 1964; div. 1980) Mike Farrell (m. 1984)
- Relatives: Nanette Fabray (aunt)

Michele Ann Marie Fabares (/ˌfæˈbreɪ/; January 19, 1944 – August 22, 2026) was an American actress and singer. She was known for her television roles as Francine Webster on One Day at a Time, as Mary on sitcom The Donna Reed Show (1958–1963), and as Christine Armstrong on sitcom Coach (1989–1997), the last of which earned her two Primetime Emmy Awards nominations. Her film roles included playing leading lady to Elvis Presley in Girl Happy (1965), Spinout (1966), and Clambake (1967). In 1962, her recording of "Johnny Angel" reached number one on the Billboard Hot 100 chart.

== Early life ==
Michele Ann Marie Fabares was born on January 19, 1944, in Santa Monica, California. She was the younger daughter of James Alan Fabares (1909–1977), who was born in Algiers, New Orleans, and Elsa R. Eyler, who died from Alzheimer's in 1992. She has an older sister, Nanette ("Smokey"). Fabares was a niece of actress Nanette Fabray (née Fabares). She graduated from North Hollywood High School in 1961.

== Career ==
=== 1950s ===
The Donna Reed Show
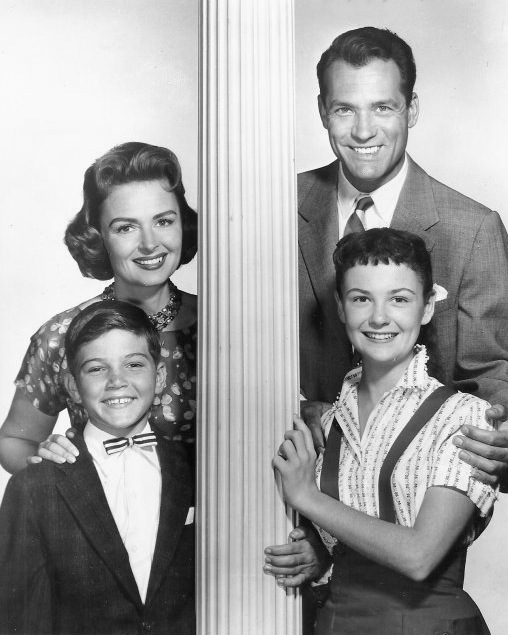
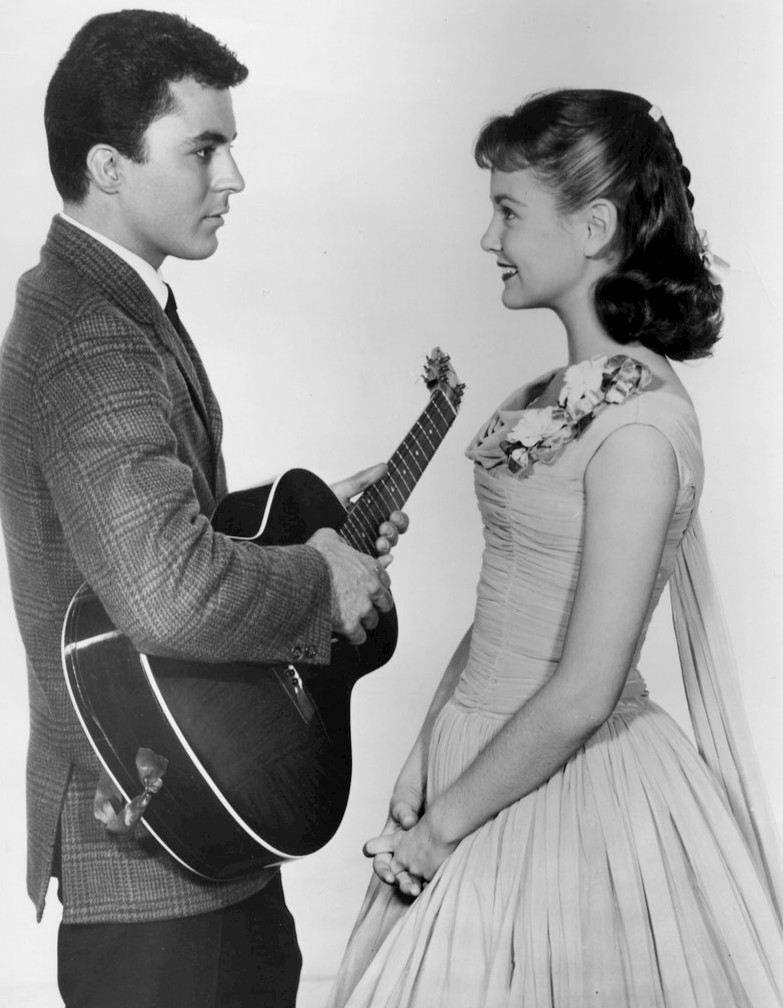
Fabares with the main cast of the show (left) and with guest star James Darren in 1959 (right)

Fabares made her acting debut at age three. At age ten, she made her first television appearance in a 1954 episode of Letter to Loretta, "The Clara Schumann Story". Her early television appearances included the Producers' Showcase adaptation of Our Town starring Frank Sinatra and Paul Newman. She played Young Cathy in a Matinee Theatre adaptation of Wuthering Heights. Fabares had small parts in The Girl Rush (1955), Never Say Goodbye (1956), The Bad Seed (1956), Rock, Pretty Baby! (1956), Jeanne Eagels (1957), Marjorie Morningstar (1958), and Summer Love (1958). On television, Fabares was on Captain Midnight, Annie Oakley, Fury, and Colgate Theatre.

She portrayed Moselle Corey on Annette (1958) starring Annette Funicello. Fabares guest starred on Mr. Novak, The Eleventh Hour, Arrest and Trial, and The Twilight Zone episode "Black Leather Jackets".

In 1958, Fabares landed the role of Mary Stone in the long-running family sitcom The Donna Reed Show. The series ran until 1966. Fabares quickly established herself as a favorite with teen audiences.

=== 1960s and 1970s ===
Fabares's national popularity led to a recording contract and two Top 40 hits, including "Johnny Angel," which went to number one on the Billboard Hot 100 in April 1962 and peaked at number 41 in the UK. It sold over one million copies and was certified gold. In June 1962 she released the album, Shelley! "I was stunned about that, to put it mildly," she later said. "After all, I never could sing." She followed with a second album in September 1962, The Things We Did Last Summer, which included two hit songs: "Johnny Loves Me," which reached No. 21, and "The Things We Did Last Summer," which peaked at No. 46.

In Canada, she had three songs in the Top 40 with "Johnny Angel" at No. 1 for three weeks, "Johnny Loves Me" at No. 24, and "Ronnie, Call Me When You Get a Chance" at No. 16 for two weeks. She released a third album, Teenage Triangle in 1963. That same year, Fabares left The Donna Reed Show to pursue other acting opportunities, returning periodically until the show's end in 1966.

Fabares co-starred in the film Ride the Wild Surf (1964). She then appeared as Elvis Presley's leading lady in MGM's Girl Happy (1965). Also at MGM, she played the love interest of Peter Noone (of Herman's Hermits) in Hold On! (1966), in which she performed the song "Make Me Happy." Around this time, MGM produced a television pilot based on Meet Me in St. Louis starring Fabares. She was paired with Presley again for Spinout (1966), also at MGM, and Clambake (1967), at United Artists. Producer Sam Katzman later cast her as the love interest of a young Hank Williams Jr. in A Time to Sing (1968).

Fabares's film work declined in the late 1960s, and she later returned to television, appearing as a guest star in series including The Ghost & Mrs. Muir, Daniel Boone, Medical Center, Lancer, Bracken's World, and The Interns. She later recalled a four-year period during which she was unable to find acting work, describing the entertainment industry as cyclical, with periods of both frequent and limited employment.

Following Mannix, Fabares appeared in television series such as Longstreet, Owen Marshall, Counselor at Law, Love, American Style, The Rockford Files, McCloud, and Cade's County. She later said she had been reluctant to take risks in choosing roles. She had supporting roles in the television films Brian's Song (1971), in which she portrayed the wife of Brian Piccolo, and Two for the Money (1972). Her performance in Brian's Song earned her a Golden Globe nomination.

From 1972 to 1974, Fabares had a regular role on The Brian Keith Show, which was titled The Little People during its first season and ran for 47 episodes. Following the series' cancellation she made guest appearances in Police Story, Ironside, The Rockford Files, The Rookies, Matt Helm, Medical Story, Marcus Welby, M.D., Barnaby Jones, and Spencer's Pilots. She later appeared in the television film Sky Heist (1975) and had a regular role alongside Danny Thomas on The Practice from 1976 to 1977.

Following The Practice, Fabares had a regular role on Forever Fernwood. In 1978, she began playing Francine Webster on the CBS sitcom One Day at a Time, a role she reprised during the final three seasons of the series. She also made guest appearances on Lucan, Vega$, The Incredible Hulk, Hello, Larry, and Fantasy Island. Her television film credits during this period included Pleasure Cove (1979), Donovan's Kid (1979), Friendships, Secrets and Lies (1979), and The Great American Traffic Jam (1980). In 1979, she starred in the television series Highcliffe Manor, which ended after six episodes.

=== 1980s and 1990s ===
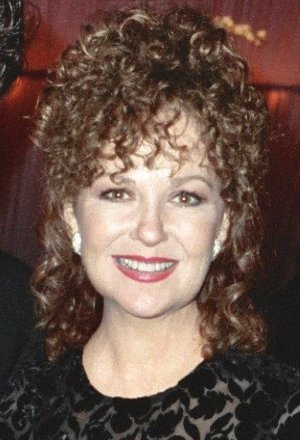
Fabares in 1991.

During the 1980s, Fabares made guest appearances on the television series Mork & Mindy, Matt Houston, The Love Boat, Newhart, and Murder, She Wrote. She appeared in the television film Memorial Day (1983) with Mike Farrell, whom she later married, and in the films Suburban Beat (1985), The Canterville Ghost (1985), Hot Pursuit (1987), and Run Till You Fall (1988).

In 1989, Fabares was cast as Christine Armstrong Fox on the ABC sitcom Coach. She described the series as well-written and said she was attracted to the opportunity to portray a successful and ambitious woman. The series initially struggled in the ratings before moving to a time slot following Roseanne. Its ratings subsequently improved, and it ran until 1997.

For her work on Coach, Fabares received two Primetime Emmy Award nominations. In 1994, she received the Young Artist Foundation's Former Child Star "Lifetime Achievement" Award for her portrayal of Mary Stone on The Donna Reed Show. During the run of Coach, she also appeared in the television films Love or Money (1990), Deadly Relations (1993), The Great Mom Swap (1995), and A Nightmare Come True (1997).

=== Later career ===
After Coach ended in 1997, Fabares voiced the role of Martha Kent (and her husband Mike Farrell played Jonathan Kent) on Superman: The Animated Series. She reprised the role twice, once in Justice League and again for the direct-to-video film Superman: Brainiac Attacks (2006). Fabares also featured in the television film Playing to Win: A Moment of Truth Movie (1998).

From 2004 to 2017, Fabares was a producer for the Screen Actors Guild Awards.

== Personal life and death ==
Fabares married producer Lou Adler in 1964. They separated in 1966 and divorced in 1980. In 1984, she married actor Mike Farrell. She had no biological children, but was a stepmother to Farrell's two children from his previous marriage to Judy Farrell.

In October 2000, Fabares received a liver transplant after being diagnosed with autoimmune hepatitis.

Fabares died on August 22, 2026, at her home in Los Angeles, at the age of 82. Her family later confirmed that the cause of death was pneumonia.

== Filmography ==
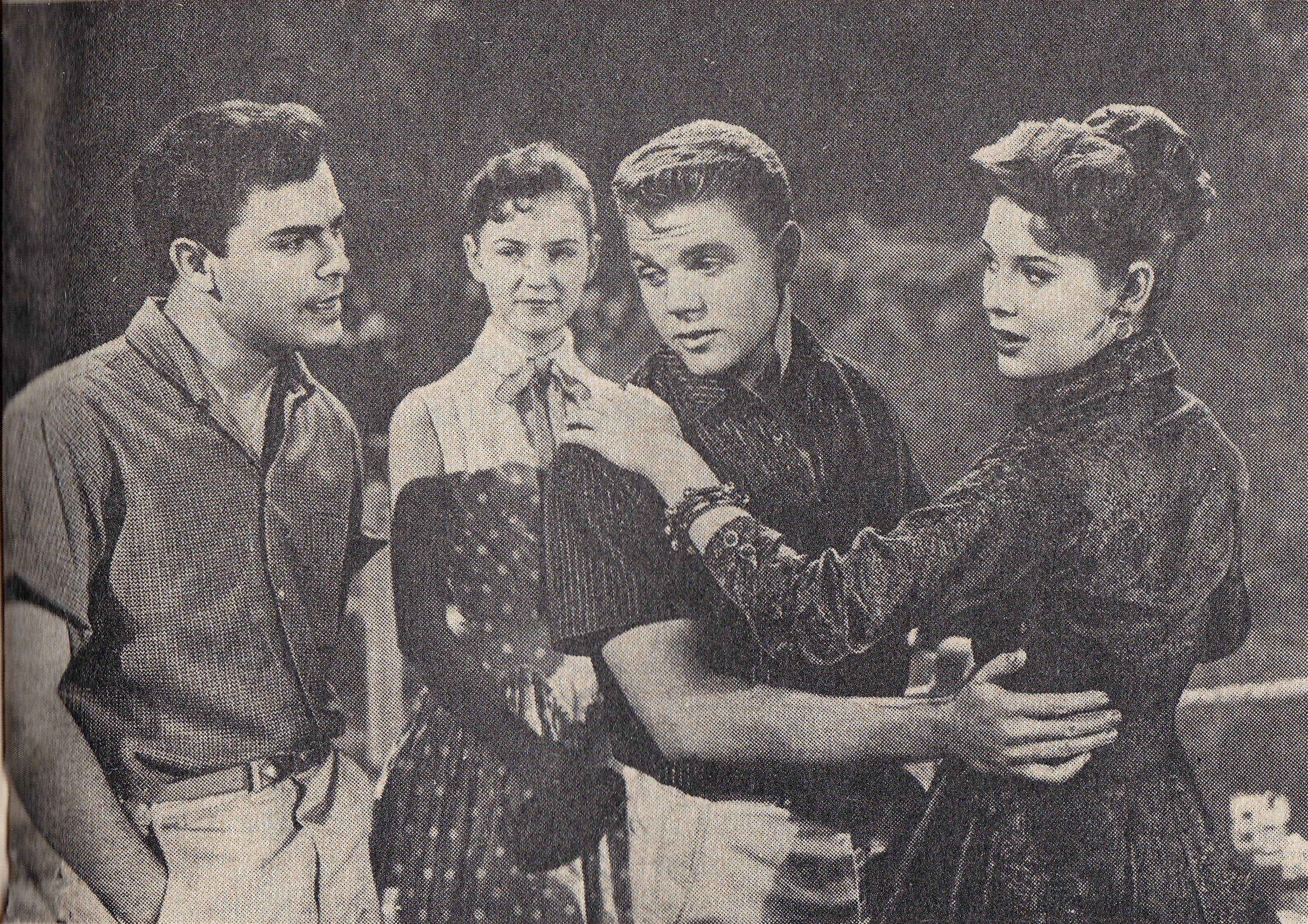
John Saxon, Shelley Fabares, John Wilder and Jill St. John in Summer Love (1958)

Film
Year	Title	Role	Notes
1955	The Girl Rush	Kim Halliday (Age 9)	Uncredited
1956	Never Say Goodbye	Suzy Parker	
1956	The Bad Seed	Margie	Uncredited
1956	Rock, Pretty Baby	Twinkie Daley	
1957	Jeanne Eagels	Teenage Girl	Uncredited
1958	Summer Love	Twinkie Daley	sequel to Rock, Pretty Baby
1958	Marjorie Morningstar	Seth's Girl Friend	Uncredited
1964	Ride the Wild Surf	Brie Matthews	
1965	Girl Happy	Valerie Frank	
1966	Hold On!	Louisa Page	Alternative title: There's No Place Like Space
1966	Spinout	Cynthia Foxhugh	
1967	Clambake	Dianne Carter	
1968	A Time to Sing	Amy Carter	
1987	Hot Pursuit	Buffy Cronenberg	
1990	Love or Money	LuAnn Reed	Alternative title: For Love or Money
2006	Superman: Brainiac Attacks	Martha Kent (voice)	Direct-to-video; final role

Television
Year	Title	Role	Notes
1954–1958	The Loretta Young Show	Marie Schumann; Kathy	2 episodes
1955	Producers' Showcase	Rebecca Gibbs	Episode: "Our Town"
1955	Matinee Theater	Young Cathy	Episode: "Wuthering Heights"
1955	Captain Midnight	Mary Kingsley	Episode: "Flight Into the Unknown"
1956	Annie Oakley	Prudy Warren	Episode: "Treasure Map"
1957	Fury	Midge Malloy	Episode: "The Tomboy"
1958	Walt Disney Presents: Annette	Moselle Corey	15 episodes
1958	Colgate Theatre		Episode: "Welcome to Washington"
1958–1964	The Donna Reed Show	Mary Stone	191 episodes
1959	The Rebel	Nora Hendry	1 episode
1963	Mr. Novak	Dani Cooper	2 episodes
1964	The Eleventh Hour	Carol Hamilton	Episode: "How Do I Say I Love You?"
1964	Arrest and Trial	Donna Blaney	Episode: "An Echo of Conscience"
1964	The Twilight Zone	Ellen Tillman	Episode: "Black Leather Jackets"
1966	Meet Me in St. Louis	Esther	Television film
1968	The Ghost & Mrs. Muir	Vanessa	Episode: "Vanessa"
1969	Daniel Boone	Charity Brown	Episode: "A Touch of Charity"
1969	Lancer	Melissa Harper	Episode: "Juniper's Camp"
1969	Bracken's World	Hilary Saxon	Episode: "Package Deal"
1969-1972	Love, American Style	Various Roles	3 episodes
1969	Medical Center	"Mike" Carter	Episode: "Operation Heartbeat"
1971	The Interns	Catherine	Episode: "The Guardian"
1971	Mannix	Gwen Townsend	Episode: "A Step in Time"
1971	Longstreet	Marianne Franklin	Episode: "The Girl with the Broom"
1971	Brian's Song	Joy Piccolo	ABC Movie of the Week
1971	Owen Marshall, Counselor at Law	Lorraine Latham	Episode: "Burden of Proof"
1972	McCloud	Natalie Rudell	Episode: "Fifth Man in a String Quartet"
1972	Two for the Money	Bethany Hagen	ABC Movie of the Week
1972	Cade's County	Stephanie Grainger	Episode: "The Fake"
1972–1974	The Little People/The Brian Keith Show	Dr. Anne Jamison	47 episodes
1974	Police Story	Annette Weiner	Episode: "Wolf"
1974	Ironside	Charlotte Black	Episode: "The Far Side of the Fence"
1974	The Rockford Files	Jolene Hyland	Episode: "Caledonia – It's Worth a Fortune!"
1975	The Rookies	Ann McNeal	Episode: "Solomon's Dilemma"
1975	Sky Heist	Lisa	Television film
1975	Matt Helm	Chris/Tina	Episode: "Now I Lay Me Down To Die"
1975	Medical Story	Susan Duffy	Episode: "An Air Full of Death"
1975	Barnaby Jones	Susan Burke	Episode: "Flight to Danger"
1976	Marcus Welby, M.D.	Norma Fritchie	Episode: "Strike Two!"
1976	Spencer's Pilots	Annette	Episode: "The Code"
1976–1977	The Practice	Jenny Bedford	27 episodes
1977–1978	Forever Fernwood	Eleanor Major	37 episodes
1978	Lucan	Marsha	Episode: "The Pariah"
1978	Vega$	Linda Stockwood	Episode: "The Games Girls Play"
1978	The Incredible Hulk	Holly Cooper	Episode: "Escape from Los Santos"
1978–1984	One Day at a Time	Francine Webster	26 episodes
1978–1981	Fantasy Island	Various Roles	5 episodes
1979	Pleasure Cove	Helen Perlmutter	Television film
1979	Donovan's Kid	Grace Donovan	Television film
1979	Hello, Larry	Marion Alder	3 episodes
1979	Friendships, Secrets and Lies	Mary Alice	Television film
1979	Highcliffe Manor	Helen Blacke	6 episodes
1980	Gridlock	Louise Gregory	Television film
1980–1981	Mork & Mindy	Cathy	3 episodes
1980–1985	The Love Boat	Various Roles	3 episodes
1983	Matt Houston	Barbara Newton	Episode: "The Visitors"
1983	ABC Afterschool Special	Fran Brogliatti	Episode: "The Celebrity and the Arcade Kid"
1983	Memorial Day	Ellie Walker	Television film
1984	His & Hers	Barbara McCabe	Television film
1985	The Canterville Ghost	Lucy	Television film
1985	Suburban Beat	Mimi Gluskin	Television film
1987	Newhart	Diane Beckwith	Episode: "The First of the Belles"
1988	Run Till You Fall	Kathy Reuben	Television film
1989	Murder, She Wrote	Liza Caspar	2 episodes
1989	Class Cruise	Ellen Poston	Television film
1989–1997	Coach	Christine Armstrong	199 episodes
1993	It Had to Be You	Debbie Hayes	Episode: "Wheel of Laura"
1993	Deadly Relations	Shirley Fagot	Television film
1995	The Great Mom Swap	Millie Ridgeway	Television film
1996–1998	Superman: The Animated Series	Martha Kent (voice)	8 episodes
1997	A Nightmare Come True	Lily Zarn	Television film
1998	Playing to Win: A Moment of Truth Movie	Nancy Erickson	Television film
2003	Justice League	Martha Kent (voice)	Episode: "Comfort and Joy"

== Discography ==
=== Studio albums ===
- Shelley! – Colpix Records CP-426 (Mono)/SCP-426 (Stereo) – No. 106, July 62
- The Things We Did Last Summer – Colpix CP-431/SCP-431 – No. 121, 10/62
- Teenage Triangle – Colpix CP-444/SCP-444 – No. 48, May 63

Featuring four tracks each by Shelley, James Darren and Paul Petersen

- Bye Bye Birdie – Colpix CP-454/SCP-454 – 1963

Songs from the movie sung by Shelley, The Marcels, James Darren and Paul Petersen

- More Teenage Triangle – Colpix CP-468/SCP-468 – 1964

Second compilation featuring Shelley, James Darren and Paul Petersen

=== Soundtrack songs ===
- "Spring Fever" (1965) with Elvis Presley from Girl Happy (The soundtrack album only features Presley's vocals)
- "Make Me Happy" (March 1966) from Hold On! MGM Records
- "Next Time I Say Goodbye I'm Leaving" (1968) from soundtrack of A Time to Sing (Music From The Original Soundtrack) MCA Records – MCA-1458

=== Compilations ===
- Rare Items And Big Hits Colpix Records (1989)
- The Best of Shelley Fabares Rhino Records R2 71651 – 1994
- Shelley Fabares Johnny Angel Collectables Records No. 9931 July 2005
- Shelley Fabares Meets Paul Petersen Collectables Records July 2009
- Growing Up-The 1962 Recordings Jasmine Records 2014

=== Singles ===
Year	Title	B-side	U.S.	Label and number
February 1962	"Johnny Angel"	"Where's It Gonna Get Me"	1	Colpix 621
April 1962	"What Did They Do Before Rock 'n' Roll"(with Paul Petersen)	"Very Unlikely" (with Paul Petersen)	–	Colpix 631
May 1962	"Johnny Loves Me"	"I'm Growing Up"	21	Colpix 636
August 1962	"The Things We Did Last Summer"	"Breaking Up Is Hard to Do"	46	Colpix 654
December 1962	"Telephone (Won't You Ring)"	"Big Star"	109	Colpix 667
March 1963	"Ronnie, Call Me When You Get a Chance"	"I Left a Note to Say Goodbye"	72	Colpix 682
October 1963	"Welcome Home"	"Billy Boy"	–	Colpix 705
January 1964	"Football Season's Over"	"He Don't Love Me"	–	Colpix 721
September 1964	"I Know You'll Be There"	"Lost Summer Love"	–	Vee-Jay VJ632
May 1965	"My Prayer"	"Pretty Please"	–	Dunhill D-4001
August 1966	"See Ya 'Round On the Rebound"	"Pretty Please"	–	Dunhill D-4041

== Awards and nominations ==
Year	Award	Result	Category	Film or series
1965	Laurel Awards	Nominated	New Faces, Female	–
1993	Primetime Emmy Award	Nominated	Outstanding Supporting Actress in a Comedy Series	Coach
1994	Primetime Emmy Award	Nominated	Outstanding Supporting Actress in a Comedy Series	Coach
1994	Young Artist Award	Won	Former Child Star Lifetime Achievement Award	The Donna Reed Show
2004	TV Land Award	Nominated	Favorite Teen Dream – Female	The Donna Reed Show
