= Charlotte Knight (actress) =

American actress and screenwriter (1894–1977)

- Born: Charlotte Anna Nachtwey; February 8, 1894
- Died: May 16, 1977 (aged 83)

Charlotte Anna Nachtwey (8 February 1894 - 16 May 1977) was an American television, film, and stage actress and screenwriter, working as Charlott (or Charlotte) Knight. As a writer, Knight is best known for 20 Million Miles to Earth (1957). As an actress, she played small parts in Petticoat Junction (1963) and The Red Skelton Show (1962).

Knight met stop motion animator Ray Harryhausen while working as his acting coach. Harryhausen hired Knight to write the stories for his Mother Goose Stories series. Harryhausen later brought Knight on to rewrite his treatment for a film called The Giant Ymir, which became 20 Million Miles to Earth.

== Early life ==
Knight was born in Pine Grove, Wisconsin, the daughter of Anton Nachtwey and Mary Anna Burkhardt. Her family lived in Dorchester and Green Bay during her early life.

She was one of two women to graduate in the Class of 1924 from the Marquette Law School.

== Filmography ==
=== As actor ===
Knight appeared, often uncredited, in a number of features and television shows.

==== Features ====
- Names of Sin (1975, Short) – The Old Lady (as Charlotte Knight)
- Star! (1968) – Woman in Brixton Music Hall (uncredited)
- Valley of the Dolls (1967) – Neely O’Hara's Maid (uncredited)
- Desire Under the Elms (1958) – Midwife (uncredited)
- The Ten Commandments (1956) – Slave (uncredited)
- Sincerely Yours (1955) – Housekeeper (uncredited)
- It’s a Wonderful Life (1946) – Bank Depositor (uncredited)
- The Clock (1945) – Reception Clerk (uncredited)

==== Television ====
- Petticoat Junction (1965) – Emmy Puddleford / Woman Juror (2 episodes)
- The Beverly Hillbillies (1965) – Newshen (1 episode)
- Alfred Hitchcock Presents (1956–1962) – Cleaning Woman / Actress (multiple episodes)
- The Adventures of Ozzie and Harriet (1955) – Charlotte (1 episode)
- Numerous anthology and series guest roles (Sugarfoot, Dragnet, Bat Masterson, Whirlybirds, Big Town, Lux Video Theatre, etc.)

=== As writer ===
- 20 Million Miles to Earth (story by) (1957)
- The Story of King Midas (1953, short)
- The Story of ‘Rapunzel’ (1951, short)
- The Story of Little Red Riding Hood (1949, short)

== Death ==
Knight died of heart failure at the Motion Picture Hospital in Los Angeles on May 16, 1977, at the age of 83. She is buried in the Saint Paul and Saint Jude North Catholic Cemetery in Bloomer, Wisconsin.
