= Stu Phillips (composer) =

American songwriter

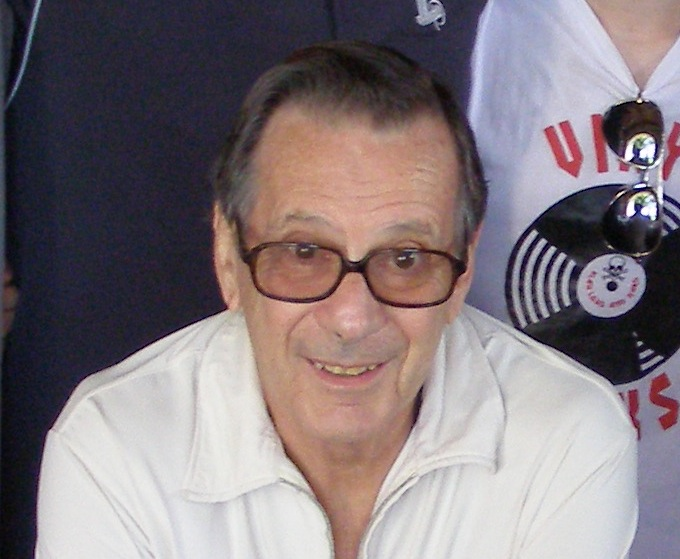
- Phillips in 2007

Background information
- Born: Stuart Phillips; September 9, 1929 (age 97)
- Genre: Classical
- Occupations: Composer, arranger, conductor
- Years active: 1958–present
- Labels: Colpix, Capitol
- Website: www.stuwho.com

Stuart Phillips (born September 9, 1929) is an American composer of film scores and television series theme music, conductor and record producer. He is best known for composing the theme tunes to the television series McCloud, Battlestar Galactica, and Knight Rider.

== Biography ==
=== Career ===
Phillips studied music at The High School of Music & Art in New York City, New York, and at the Eastman School of Music in Rochester, New York. While at Eastman, he began arranging music for the Rochester Civic Orchestra.

In 1958, Phillips began composing for Columbia Pictures' television and record subsidiaries. He founded Colpix Records and produced high-charting hits for James Darren, Nina Simone, The Skyliners, Shelley Fabares, and The Monkees. He also furnished music for Columbia's television series, including The Donna Reed Show with Fabares and The Monkees. Phillips branched out into motion-picture work, and scored Columbia's 1964 movie, Ride the Wild Surf.

In the mid-1960s, he worked for Capitol Records and created, produced and arranged for the easy listening studio orchestra the Hollyridge Strings. Excerpts from the Hollyridge Strings album The Beatles Song Book can be heard on the 1964 Capitol documentary album The Beatles' Story.

In the late 1960s and early 1970s, Phillips continued scoring films and television series including music for the films Beyond the Valley of the Dolls (1970), The Seven Minutes (1971) and the television series Get Christie Love!.

In 1974, he began working at Universal Studios scoring television series; Glen A. Larson made extensive use of his compositions. During this time, he scored music for the television series The Six Million Dollar Man, McCloud, and Battlestar Galactica. His Battlestar Galactica theme was featured prominently in the film Airplane II: The Sequel (1982). He also composed music for the television series The Amazing Spider-Man (which was for Charles Fries/Dan Goodman/Danchuck Productions) during this time.

In the 1980s, Phillips left Universal and began working at 20th Century Fox, again being a favorite composer of Glen A. Larson, where he composed music for the television series The Fall Guy, Automan and Knight Rider. All programs were Larson productions.

=== Later years ===
Phillips went into semi-retirement in the 1990s at his home in Studio City, California. Since that time, he has appeared at fan conventions for Battlestar Galactica and has attended cult-film screenings for Beyond the Valley of the Dolls.

In 2002, Phillips published his autobiography Stu Who?: Forty Years of Navigating the Minefields of the Music Business.

In 2006, he also participated in a documentary film featured on the special edition DVD re-release of Beyond the Valley of the Dolls.

Long a "serious" musician, Phillips has also orchestrated piano pieces by Ludwig van Beethoven and Sergei Rachmaninoff.

Phillips can be heard on FaLaLaLaLa.com discussing the history of The Hollyridge Strings's Christmas album, which it released in 2008.

== Filmography ==
=== Film music ===
- Mad Dog Coll (1961)
- The Man from the Diner's Club (1963)
- Ride the Wild Surf (1964)
- Dead Heat on a Merry-Go-Round (1966)
- Hells Angels on Wheels (1967)
- The Name of the Game Is Kill! (1968)
- Angels from Hell (1968)
- 2000 Years Later (1969)
- Run, Angel, Run! (1969)
- Follow Me (1969)
- The Gay Deceivers (1969)
- Venus in Furs (also known as Paroxismus) (Uncredited, 1969)
- Beyond the Valley of the Dolls (1970)
- Nam's Angels (1970)
- The Curious Female (1970)
- Savage Intruder (1970)
- The Red, White, and Black (1970)
- Revenge Is My Destiny (1971)
- Simon, King of the Witches (1971)
- The Seven Minutes (1971)
- Jud (1971)
- Pickup on 101 (1972)
- Throw Out the Anchor! (1974)
- How to Seduce a Woman (1974)
- Macon County Line (1974)
- The Meal (1975)
- Buck Rogers in the 25th Century (1979)
- Fast Charlie... the Moonbeam Rider (1979)
- Hollywood Goes to the Bowl 2004 (2004)

== Recordings ==
Phillips made soundtrack recordings on UNI and MCA Records. He made general recordings on Capitol Records.

=== Television music ===
GL denotes a Glen Larson production, where known. Phillips was one of Larson's favorite composers.

- The Donna Reed Show (Unknown episodes, 1958)
- Rockabye the Infantry (1963)
- The Monkees (54 episodes, 1966–1968)
- The Six Million Dollar Man: Wine, Women and War (1973) GL
- Get Christie Love! (Unknown episodes, 1974) GL
- Switch (2 episodes, 1975) GL
- McCloud (8 episodes, 1974–1976) GL
- Benny and Barney: Las Vegas Undercover (1977)
- The Hardy Boys/Nancy Drew Mysteries (14 episodes, 1977) GL
- Quincy, M.E. (17 episodes, 1976–1977) GL
- The Amazing Spider-Man (Unknown episodes, 1978)
- Evening in Byzantium (1978)
- Battlestar Galactica (Pilot/TV movie, 1978) GL
- Buck Rogers in the 25th Century (1979) GL
- Battlestar Galactica (21 episodes, 1978–1979) GL
- The Misadventures of Sheriff Lobo (Unknown episodes, 1980–1981) GL
- Conquest of the Earth (1980) GL
- Galactica 1980 (Unknown episodes, 1980) GL
- B. J. and the Bear (1 episode, 1980) GL
- Battles: The Murder That Wouldn't Die (1980) GL
- Waikiki (1980)
- Midnight Lace (1981)
- Buck Rogers in the 25th Century (5 episodes, 1979–1981) GL
- The Fall Guy (Unknown episodes, 1981) GL
- Chicago Story (Unknown episodes, 1982)
- Terror at Alcatraz (1982)
- Rooster (1982)
- Automan (4 episodes, 1983) GL
- Masquerade (1 episode, 1983) GL
- Knight Rider (14 episodes, 1982–1984) GL
- Half Nelson (Unknown episodes, 1985) GL
- In Like Flynn (1985)
- The Highwayman (Pilot/TV Movie, 1987) GL
- The Highwayman (1 episode, 1988) GL
- The Road Raiders (1989)

== Awards and nominations ==
Grammy Award

- Nominated: 1964 Best Instrumental Performance - Non Jazz, The Beatles Song Book (Hollyridge Strings)
- Nominated: 1979 Best Album of Original Score Written for a Motion Picture or a Television Special, Battlestar Galactica

BMI Film & TV Awards

- Won: 2005 Best Ringtone, Knight Rider
