= Colpix Records =

Defunct American recording company

- Parent company: Columbia Pictures–Screen Gems
- Founded: 1958; 67 years ago
- Founder: Jonie Taps, Harry Cohn
- Defunct: 1966; 59 years ago
- Status: Defunct
- Genre: Pop, jazz
- Country of origin: U.S.
- Location: New York City

Colpix Records was the first recording company for Columbia Pictures–Screen Gems. Colpix got its name from combining Columbia (Col) and Pictures (Pix). CBS, which owned Columbia Records, then sued Columbia Pictures for trademark infringement over the Colpix name.

It was founded by Jonie Taps and Harry Cohn in 1958 and was based in New York City. Paul Wexler headed the label. Stu Phillips was in charge of A&R. Lester Sill later headed the label, after breaking with Philles Records partner Phil Spector.

The label's roster included Lou Christie, James Darren, Paul Petersen, Freddie Scott, Tommy Boyce. Two of the label's best known number one hits on the Billboard Hot 100 Singles Charts were "Blue Moon" by The Marcels in the spring of 1961 (also a number one in the UK, where Colpix was licensed to Pye International), and "Johnny Angel" by Shelley Fabares in the spring of 1962. Bernadette Castro recorded for the label "Get Rid of Him"/"A Girl in Love Forgives" and "His Lips Get in the Way"/"Sportscar Sally". Singer Jo Ann Greer, who dubbed several of the actresses at Columbia Pictures, recorded two albums with the studio's musical director, Morris Stoloff: Soundtracks, Voices and Themes and The Naked City, a film noir musical with James Darren.

Colpix released the first LPs from standup comedians Dick Gregory and Woody Allen, and a soundtrack album of Hanna-Barbera cartoons. It included dialogue by Yogi Bear and Pixie and Dixie with narration by Daws Butler in the voice of Huckleberry Hound.

In the wake of President Kennedy's assassination on November 22, 1963, numerous tribute albums were released the following year. In association with United Press International, Colpix released Four Days That Shocked the World with radio coverage of the President's arrival at Dallas Love Field, the moment of the shooting in Dealey Plaza, and the shooting of Lee Harvey Oswald two days later. The album included a booklet with UPI reporter Merriman Smith's account of the assassination.

The label was discontinued in 1966 and replaced by Colgems Records, which was primarily used for releases by The Monkees. Before their involvement with the Monkees, Davy Jones and Michael Nesmith (under the pseudonym Michael Blessing) had each signed to Colpix Records as solo artists.

Colpix was the first big label for singer and pianist Nina Simone after having made her debut on Bethlehem Records. She recorded albums for the label from 1959 (The Amazing Nina Simone) through 1964 (Folksy Nina). In 1966, Colpix released Nina Simone with Strings, an album of left-overs with strings added, when Simone was already signed to Philips Records.

Rhino Records, which currently owns the Colpix catalogue, issued a double compact disc compilation, The Colpix-Dimension Story, in 1994, which also included selections from Dimension Records, a related label.

== Discography ==
Album	Year	Pr. #
Adventures in Space - Ruff and Reddy	1959	CP-201
Huckleberry Hound - The Great Kellogg's TV Show	1959	CP-202
Quick Draw McDraw - Original TV Soundtrack Voices	1960	CP-203
Yogi Bear and Boo Boo - Original TV Soundtracks!	1961	CP-205
Here Comes Huckleberry Hound - Original TV Soundtracks!	1961	CP-207
Mr. Jinks, Pixie & Dixie - Original TV Soundtracks!	1961	CP-208
Huckleberry Hound and The Ghost Ship	1962	CP-210
Quick Draw McGraw - The Treasure of Sarah's Mattress	1962	CP-211
Top Cat - Original TV Soundtracks!	1962	CP-212
The Jetsons - Original TV Soundtracks!	1962	CP-213
The Flintstones - Original TV Soundtracks!	1961	CP-302
Hey There It's Yogi Bear - Original Soundtrack Recording	1964	CP-472

== See also ==
- List of record labels
- Colgems Records
