= Carvin & Ivan =

American music production duo

- Also known as: Orthodox & Ransum, Karma, Karma Productions
- Origin: Philadelphia, Pennsylvania, U.S.
- Genres: R&B; hip hop; soul; pop
- Occupations: Producing; songwriting; mixing; recording engineer
- Instruments: Drum machine; keyboards; synthesizers; sequencer; Logic Pro
- Years active: 1997–present
- Members: Ivan Barias; Carvin Haggins

Carvin & Ivan are a production duo from Philadelphia consisting of producers and songwriters Ivan "Orthodox" Barias and Carvin "Ransum" Haggins. Initially starting out as solo hip hop artists, Haggins and Barias moved into production and songwriting. They have written and produced songs for Jazmine Sullivan, Jill Scott, Faith Evans, Musiq Soulchild, Justin Timberlake, Mario, Chris Brown, Ledisi, Raheem DeVaughn, Keyshia Cole, Jaheim, Estelle, Floetry, Skillz, Ace Hood, Rick Ross and others.

They are notable for introducing Musiq Soulchild to the world and giving him his staple sound. They are responsible for writing and producing the vast majority of Musiq's more popular charted singles such as "Just Friends (Sunny)", "Halfcrazy", "Dontchange", "B.U.D.D.Y.", "Teachme" and others.

Ivan currently serves on the board of governors and is the president of the Philadelphia Chapter of The Recording Academy. On February 1, 2011, Carvin & Ivan became creative ambassadors for the city of Philadelphia as a part of Greater Philadelphia Tourism Marketing Corporation's Philly 360°.

== Early years and history ==
Carvin & Ivan met in the mid-1990s at A Touch Of Jazz, a recording studio in Philadelphia owned by DJ Jazzy Jeff.

In 2011, Ivan was selected as an ambassador of the Philadelphia 76ers community program La Liga del Barrio.

== Discography ==
=== 1997 ===
Kenny Lattimore - Love Jones: The Music

- "Can't Get Enough" (produced by Carvin Haggins and Kenny Lattimore)

=== 1998 ===
Kenny Lattimore - From the Soul of Man

- "Destiny" (produced by Kenny Lattimore, Vidal Davis and Carvin Haggins)

=== 2000 ===
Musiq Soulchild - Aijuswanaseing

- "Girl Next Door" (produced by Carvin Haggins with Andre Harris)
- "Love" (produced by Carvin Haggins with Andre Harris)
- "You And Me" (produced by Carvin Haggins with Andre Harris)
- "Just Friends (Sunny)"
- "143" (produced by Carvin Haggins with Keith Pelzer)
- "Seventeen" (produced by Carvin Haggins with Andre Harris)
- "Poparatzi"

Jill Scott - Who Is Jill Scott? Words and Sounds Vol. 1

- "Honey Molasses"

=== 2001 ===
Jill Scott - Experience: Jill Scott 826+

- "High Post Brotha" (featuring Common)
- "Gimme"

Angie Stone - Mahogany Soul

- "The Ingredients Of Love" (featuring Musiq Soulchild)

Lina - Stranger on Earth

- "Bye Bye Baby" (produced by Ivan "Orthodox" Barias)

=== 2002 ===
Musiq Soulchild - Juslisen

- "Newness"
- "Caughtup"
- "Stopplayin"
- "Halfcrazy"
- "Time"
- "Solong"
- "Bestfriend"
- "Dontchange"
- "Something"
- "Ifiwouldaknew"

Dawn Robinson - Dawn

- "Party, Party"
- "Get Up Again"

Floetry - Floetic

- "Headache"
- "Opera"

Syleena Johnson - "Chapter 2: The Voice"

- "Dear You"
- "I'm Gon Cry"
- "No Words"
- "So Willingly"

=== 2003 ===
Musiq Soulchild - Soulstar

- "Youloveme"
- "Womanopoly"
- "Forthenight"
- "Infatueighties"
- "Whoknows"
- "Babymother"
- "Missyou"
- "Thereason"
- "Romancipation"
- "Givemorelove"

Joe - And Then...

- "Ride Wit U (featuring G-Unit)
- "Another Used To Be"
- "Testify"

=== 2004 ===
Jill Scott - Beautifully Human: Words and Sounds Vol. 2

- "Bedda At Home"
- "Family Reunion"

Mario - Turning Point

- "Like Me Real Hard"

Planet Asia - The Grand Opening

- "Pure Coke" (featuring Martin Luther)

Skillz - Okayplayer - True Notes Vol. 1

- "Take It Back"

Toshinobu Kubota - Time to Share

- "Breaking Through"
- "Hope You'll Be Well"

=== 2005 ===
Faith Evans - The First Lady

- "Again"
- "I Don't Need It"
- "Stop'n'Go"
- "Jealous"
- "Get Over You"
- "Until You Came"

Chris Brown - Chris Brown's Journey

- "So Glad"

Brian McKnight - Gemini

- "She"

=== 2006 ===
2pac- Pac's Life

- "Playa Cardz Right (Female)" (Feat: Keyshia Cole)
- "Scared Straight"

Heather Headley - In My Mind

- "Losing you"

Keshia Chanté - 2U (album)

- "Kiss"

=== 2007 ===
Musiq Soulchild - Luvanmusiq

- "Teachme" (Grammy Nominated Song: R&B Song of The Year 2008)
- "Rewind"

2pac- Best of 2Pac Part 2: Life

- "Dopefiend's Diner" (Previously Unreleased)

Freeway - Free at Last

- "This Can't Be Real" (Feat: Marsha Ambrosius)

=== 2008 ===
Raheem DeVaughn - Love Behind the Melody

- "Customer" (Grammy Nominated Song: R&B Song Of The Year 2009)

Jazmine Sullivan - Fearless

- "Foolish Heart"

Keyshia Cole - A Different Me

- "Playa Cardz Right" (featuring 2Pac)

Skillz- The Million Dollar Backpack

- "Don't Act Like You Don't Know" (featuring Freeway)

=== 2009 ===
Musiq Soulchild - OnMyRadio

- "ifyouleave" (featuring Mary J. Blige)
- "deserveumore"
- "special"
- "someone"

Ledisi - Turn Me Loose

- "Alone"
- "I Need Love"

Ace Hood - Ruthless

- "Champion" (featuring Jazmine Sullivan and Rick Ross)

Amerie - In Love & War

- "The Flowers"

=== 2010 ===
Jaheim - Another Round

- "Finding My Way Back"

Faith Evans - Something About Faith

- "Gone Already"

Skillz - The World Needs More Skillz

- "Celebrate Life"
- "Wants and Needs" (feat. Bilal)

Leela James - My Soul

- "If It's Wrong"
- "It's Over"

=== 2011 ===
Ledisi - Pieces Of Me

- "I Gotta Get To You"

Jill Scott - The Original Jill Scott from the Vault, Vol. 1

- "I Don't Know (Gotta Have You)"

=== 2012 ===
Estelle - All of Me

- "The Life"

SWV - I Missed Us

- "Love Unconditionally"

Kenny Lattimore - Back To Cool

- "Find A Way"

Alex Boyd - Commit Me

- "Wish I Knew"

Tamia - Beautiful Surprise

- "Still Love You"

Curt Chambers - One Way Ticket (entire album produced by Ivan Barias & Curt Chambers)

- One Way Ticket
- Hollywood
- Grass Is Greener
- Keep Calling (featuring Gilbere Forte)
- Out Of Body Prelude
- Out Of Body
- Out Of Body Outro
- Loaded Gun
- Loaded Gun Outro
- Desert Dry
- Desert Dry Outro
- Digging For Gold
- New America Prelude
- New America
- Incredible Redux

Q. Parker - The MANual

- "Belongs to You"
- "Completely"

=== 2013 ===
Chrisette Michelle - Better

- "Let Me Win"
- "Love Won't Leave Me Out"

Raheem DeVaughn - A Place Called Loveland

- "Interlude - Album Intro"
- "Love Connection"
- "Wrong Forever"
- "Complicated"

TGT - 3 Kings

- "Burn Out" (produced by Carvin Haggins and Ivan Barias with Javad Day)

Glenn Lewis - Moment of Truth

- "Random Thoughts"
- "Up & Down"
- "Searching For That One"
- "Closer" (co-produced by Stan Drinks)
- "I Wanna Go Deep"

=== 2014 ===
Ledisi - The Truth

- "88 Boxes"

=== 2015 ===
Kenny Lattimore - Anatomy of a Love Song

- "Find a Way"
- "You Have My Heart"
- "What Must I Do"

=== 2017 ===
Bell Biv DeVoe - Three Stripes

- "One More Try" (featuring Boyz II Men)

Stokley - Introducing Stokley

- "Organic"
- "Think About U"
- "Cross The Line"
- "Art In Motion"
- "U & I" (featuring Estelle)
- "We/Me"

Ledisi - Let Love Rule

- "Forgiveness" (produced by Ivan Barias)

== Awards and nominations ==
=== Grammy Awards ===
Year	Nominee / work	Award	Result
2002	"Love"	Best Male R&B Vocal Performance	Nominated
2003	"Halfcrazy"	Best Male R&B Vocal Performance	Nominated
2003	Juslisen	Best R&B Album	Nominated
2006	Turning Point	Best Contemporary R&B Album	Nominated
2008	"Teachme"	Best R&B Song	Nominated
2008	"B.U.D.D.Y."	Best Male R&B Vocal Performance	Nominated
2008	Luvanmusiq	Best R&B Album	Nominated
2009	"Customer"	Best R&B Song	Nominated
2009	Fearless	Best Contemporary R&B Album	Nominated
2010	"IfULeave"	Best R&B Performance by a Duo or Group with Vocals	Nominated
2010	Turn Me Loose	Best R&B Album	Nominated
2011	"Finding My Way Back"	Best R&B Song	Nominated
2011	"Finding My Way Back"	Best Male R&B Vocal Performance	Nominated
2011	"Gone Already"	Best Female R&B Vocal Performance	Nominated
2011	Another Round	Best R&B Album	Nominated
2011	The Love & War MasterPeace	Best R&B Album	Nominated
2012	Pieces of Me	Best R&B Album	Nominated
2013	Better	Best R&B Album	Nominated
2013	Three Kings	Best R&B Album	Nominated

=== Ascap Awards ===
ASCAP Rhythm & Soul Awards

- 2002 R&B Song of The Year: "Love"
- 2002 "Just Friends (Sunny)"
- 2003 "Halfcrazy"
- 2004 "Dontchange"
- 2008 "B.U.D.D.Y."
- 2008 "Teachme"
- 2010 "IfULeave"
- 2011 "Finding My Way Back"
