= Ivan Barias =

- Origin: Philadelphia, Pennsylvania, U.S.
- Genres: R&B, hip hop, soul, pop
- Occupations: Producer, songwriter, mixing & recording engineer
- Instruments: Drum machine, keyboards, synthesizers, sequencer, Logic Pro, Ableton Live, Pro Tools
- Years active: 1998–present

Ivan Barias is part of the Philadelphia production duo Carvin & Ivan. Initially starting out as a solo hip hop artist, he moved into production and songwriting. He has written and produced songs for artists including Jazmine Sullivan, Jill Scott, Musiq Soulchild, Justin Timberlake, Mario, Chris Brown, Ledisi, Raheem DeVaughn, Keyshia Cole, Jaheim, Estelle, Floetry, Skillz, Ace Hood, and Rick Ross.

== Career ==
Along with Carvin Haggins, he is known for introducing Musiq Soulchild to the world and giving him his staple sound. Together they were responsible for writing and producing the vast majority of Musiq's popular charted singles such as "Just Friends (Sunny)", "Halfcrazy", "Dontchange", "B.U.D.D.Y.", and "Teachme".

Barias is the former president of the Philadelphia Chapter of The Recording Academy and now serves on the Academy's Board of Trustees. On February 1, 2011, he became a creative ambassador for the city of Philadelphia as a part of Greater Philadelphia Tourism Marketing Corporation's Philly 360°. In 2012 he was named as one of the brightest minds of Philadelphia in Philadelphia Magazine's Innovation issue.

In 2011, Barias was selected as an ambassador of the Philadelphia 76ers community program La Liga del Barrio.

== Early years ==
Carvin & Ivan met in the mid-90s at A Touch Of Jazz, a recording studio in Philadelphia owned by DJ Jazzy Jeff.

== Discography ==
Selected discography as producer, songwriter, composer and engineer.

== 2000 ==
Musiq Soulchild - Aijuswanaseing

- "Just Friends (Sunny)"
- "Poparatzi"

== 2001 ==
Jill Scott - Experience: Jill Scott 826+

- "High Post Brotha" (featuring Common)
- "Gimme"

Angie Stone - Mahogany Soul

- "The Ingredients Of Love" (featuring Musiq Soulchild)

Lina - Stranger on Earth

- "Bye Bye Baby" (produced by Ivan "Orthodox" Barias)

== 2002 ==
Musiq Soulchild - Juslisen

- "Newness"
- "Caughtup"
- "Stopplayin"
- "Halfcrazy"
- "Time"
- "Solong"
- "Bestfriend"
- "Dontchange"
- "Something"
- "Ifiwouldaknew"

Justin Timberlake - Justified

- "Worthy Of"

Dawn Robinson - Dawn

- "Party, Party"
- "Get Up Again"

Floetry - Floetic

- "Headache"
- "Opera"

Syleena Johnson - "Chapter 2: The Voice"

- "Dear You"
- "I'm Gon Cry"
- "No Words"
- "So Willingly"

== 2003 ==
Musiq Soulchild - Soulstar

- "Youloveme"
- "Womanopoly"
- "Forthenight"
- "Infatueighties"
- "Whoknows"
- "Babymother"
- "Missyou"
- "Thereason"
- "Romancipation"
- "Givemorelove"

Joe - And Then...

- "Ride Wit U" (featuring G-Unit)
- "Another Used To Be"
- "Testify"

Hootie & The Blowfish - Hootie & the Blowfish

- "Little Brother"

== 2004 ==
Jill Scott - Beautifully Human: Words and Sounds Vol. 2

- "Bedda At Home"
- "Family Reunion"

Mario - Turning Point

- "Like Me Real Hard"

Planet Asia - The Grand Opening

- "Pure Coke" (featuring Martin Luther)

Skillz - Okayplayer - True Notes Vol. 1

- "Take It Back"

Toshinobu Kubota - Time to Share

- "Breaking Through"
- "Hope You'll Be Well"

== 2005 ==
Faith Evans - The First Lady

- "Again"
- "I Don't Need It"
- "Stop'n'Go"
- "Jealous"
- "Get Over You"
- "Until You Came"

Chris Brown - Chris Brown's Journey

- "So Glad"

Brian McKnight - Gemini

- "She"

== 2006 ==
2pac- Pac's Life

- "Playa Cardz Right (Female)" (featuring Keyshia Cole)
- "Scared Straight"

Heather Headley - In My Mind

- "Losing You"

Keshia Chanté - 2U

- "Kiss"

Javier Colon - Left of Center

- "You're The One"
- "Is This Love"
- "Poetry"

== 2007 ==
Musiq Soulchild - Luvanmusiq

- "Teachme" (Grammy-nominated song: R&B Song of the Year 2008)
- "Rewind"

2pac- Best of 2Pac Part 2: Life

- "Dopefiend's Diner" (previously unreleased)

Freeway - Free at Last

- "This Can't Be Real" (featuring Marsha Ambrosius)

Mýa - Liberation

- "Lights Go Off"
- "Switch It Up"

== 2008 ==
Raheem DeVaughn - Love Behind the Melody

- "Customer" (Grammy-nominated song: R&B Song of the Year 2009)

Jazmine Sullivan - Fearless

- "Foolish Heart"

Keyshia Cole - A Different Me

- "Playa Cardz Right" (featuring 2Pac)

Skillz- The Million Dollar Backpack

- "Don't Act Like You Don't Know" (featuring Freeway)

== 2009 ==
Musiq Soulchild - OnMyRadio

- "ifyouleave" (featuring Mary J. Blige)
- "deserveumore"
- "special"
- "someone"

Ledisi - Turn Me Loose

- "Alone"
- "I Need Love"

Ace Hood - Ruthless

- "Champion" (featuring Jazmine Sullivan and Rick Ross)

Ameriie - In Love & War

- "The Flowers"

== 2010 ==
Jaheim - Another Round

- "Finding My Way Back"

Faith Evans - Something About Faith

- "Gone Already"

Skillz - The World Needs More Skillz

- "Celebrate Life"
- "Wants and Needs" (featuring Bilal)

Leela James - My Soul

- "If It's Wrong"
- "It's Over"

== 2011 ==
Ledisi - Pieces Of Me

- "I Gotta Get To You"

Jill Scott - The Original Jill Scott from the Vault, Vol. 1

- "I Don't Know (Gotta Have You)"

== 2012 ==
Estelle - All of Me

- "The Life"

SWV - I Missed Us

- "Love Unconditionally"

Kenny Lattimore - Back To Cool

- "Find A Way"

Alex Boyd - Commit Me

- "Wish I Knew"

Tamia - Beautiful Surprise

- "Still Love You"

Q. Parker - The MANual

- "Belongs to You"
- "Completely"

== 2013 ==
Chrisette Michelle - Better

- "Let Me Win"
- "Love Won't Leave Me Out"

Raheem DeVaughn - A Place Called Loveland

- "Interlude - Album Intro"
- "Love Connection"
- "Wrong Forever"
- "Complicated"

TGT - Three Kings

- "Burn Out" (produced by Carvin Haggins and Ivan Barias with Javad Day)

Glenn Lewis - Moment of Truth

- "Random Thoughts"
- "Up & Down"
- "Searching For That One"
- "Closer" (co-produced by Stan Drinks)
- "I Wanna Go Deep"

== 2014 ==
Ledisi - The Truth

- "88 Boxes"

Kiki Rowe - Kiki Rowe

- "Too Goo To Be True"

== 2015 ==
Jamie Foxx - Hollywood: A Story of a Dozen Roses

- "Right Now"

Estelle - We Bare Bears theme song

- "We'll Be There"

Estelle - True Romance

- "Time Share"

Ledisi - The Intimate Truth

- "I Swear"

Jill Scott - Golden Moments

- "I Adore You"

Kenny Lattimore - Anatomy Of A Love Song

- "Find A Way"
- "You Have My Heart"
- "What Must I Do"

== 2017 ==
Bell Biv Devoe - Three Stripes

- "One More Try" featuring Boyz II Men

Ledisi - Let Love Rule

- "Forgiveness"

Stokley Williams - Introducing Stokley

- "Organic"
- "Think About U"
- "Cross The Line"
- "Art In Motion" featuring Robert Glasper
- "U & I" featuring Estelle
- "We/Me"

ThePLAYLIST - Chasing Goosebumps

- "Stone Cold"

== 2019 ==
DJ Aktive - The Tour (album)

- "The City Intro"
- "The City" featuring Common, DJ Jazzy Jeff, Freeway and Bri Steves
- "90s Love" featuring Marsha Ambrosius
- "It Is What It Is" featuring Musiq Soulchild
- "Run For A Body" featuring LGP QUA
- "The Apes" featuring Beanie Sigel, Capone and Khemist
- "Repeat" featuring Brave Williams
- "Pheels Like Home" featuring Raw Beauty
- "The City Outro" featuring DJ Cash Money

== Awards and nominations ==
=== Grammy Awards ===
Year	Nominee / work	Award	Result
2003	"Halfcrazy"	Best Male R&B Vocal Performance	Nominated
2003	Juslisen	Best R&B Album	Nominated
2004	"Forthenight"	Best Urban/Alternative Performance	Nominated
2005	"Are You Experienced?"	Best Urban/Alternative Performance	Nominated
2006	Turning Point	Best Contemporary R&B Album	Nominated
2008	"Teachme"	Best R&B Song	Nominated
2008	"B.U.D.D.Y."	Best Male R&B Vocal Performance	Nominated
2008	Luvanmusiq	Best R&B Album	Nominated
2009	"Customer"	Best R&B Song	Nominated
2009	Fearless	Best Contemporary R&B Album	Nominated
2010	"IfULeave"	Best R&B Performance by a Duo or Group with Vocals	Nominated
2010	Turn Me Loose	Best R&B Album	Nominated
2011	"Finding My Way Back"	Best R&B Song	Nominated
2011	"Finding My Way Back"	Best Male R&B Vocal Performance	Nominated
2011	"Gone Already"	Best Female R&B Vocal Performance	Nominated
2011	Another Round	Best R&B Album	Nominated
2011	The Love & War MasterPeace	Best R&B Album	Nominated
2012	Pieces of Me	Best R&B Album	Nominated
2014	Better	Best R&B Album	Nominated
2014	Three Kings	Best R&B Album	Nominated
2018	Let Love Rule	Best R&B Album	Nominated

=== Ascap Awards ===
ASCAP Rhythm & Soul Awards

- 2002 "Just Friends (Sunny)"
- 2003 "Halfcrazy"
- 2004 "Dontchange"
- 2008 "B.U.D.D.Y."
- 2008 "Teachme"
- 2010 "IfULeave"
- 2011 "Finding My Way Back"
