= Grow House =

2017 film directed by DJ Pooh

- Theatrical release poster
- Directed by: DJ Pooh
- Written by: DJ Pooh
- Produced by: Marcus Morton
- Starring: DeRay Davis; Lil Duval; Snoop Dogg; Faizon Love; Malcolm McDowell
- Cinematography: Joseph White
- Edited by: Devin Maurer; Sean Yates
- Production companies: Hollyweed Films; Mission Control Entertainment; Peak Distribution Partners
- Distributed by: Rocky Mountain Pictures
- Release date: April 20, 2017
- Country: United States
- Language: English
- Budget: $8.3 million

Grow House is a 2017 American stoner comedy film written and directed by DJ Pooh, starring DeRay Davis, Lil Duval, Snoop Dogg, Faizon Love and Malcolm McDowell. The film premiered at the Fox Bruin Theater on April 17, 2017, and was released on April 20 (4/20).

== Plot ==
Two stoners, Pat (DeRay Davis) and Darius (Lil Duval) embark on a plan to grow marijuana and sell it to dispensaries. Unfortunately, the two know how to smoke weed, but not how to grow it.

== Cast ==
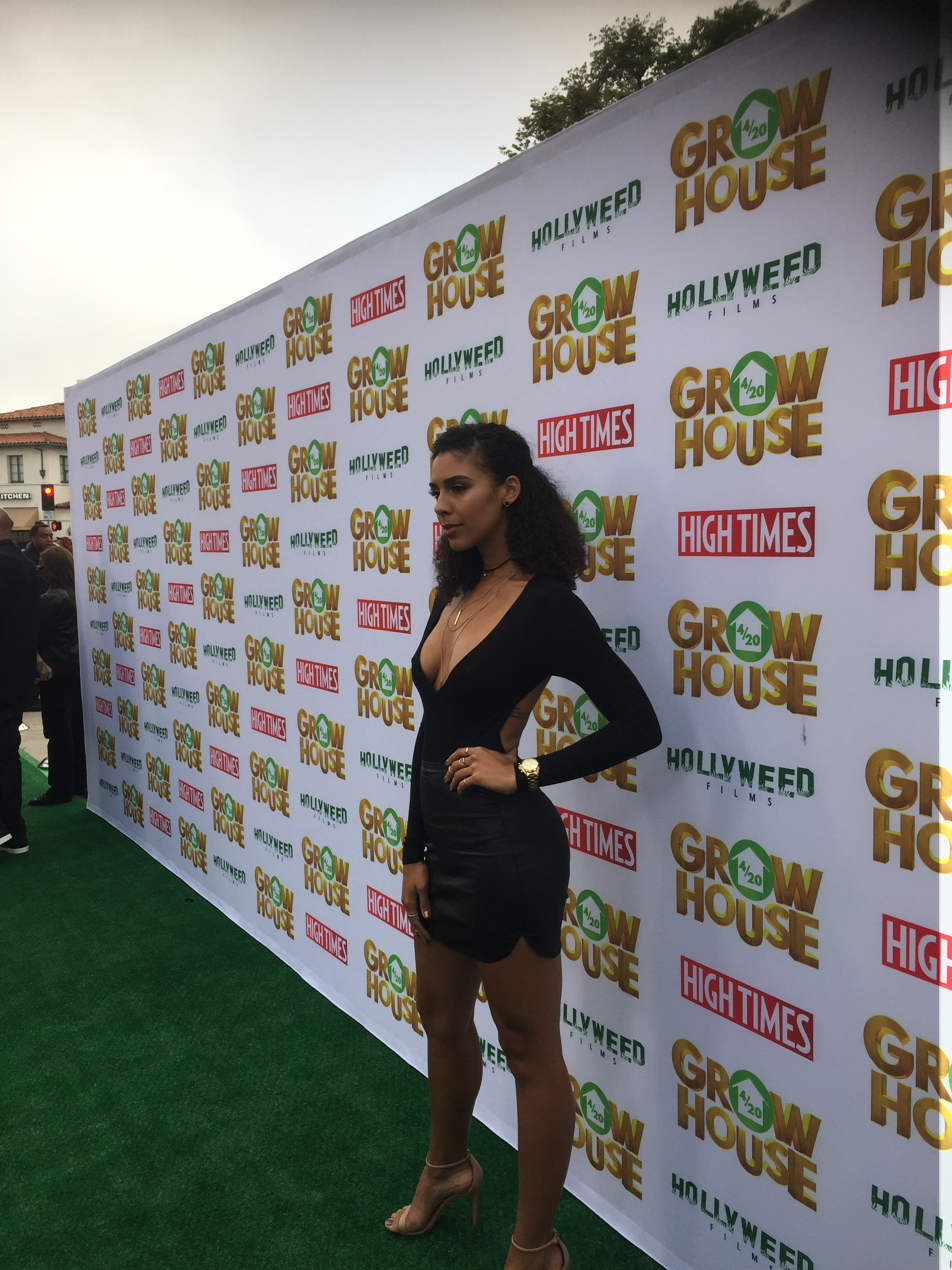
Actress Alice Hunter at the premiere

- Malcolm McDowell as Dr. Doobie
- Snoop Dogg as himself
- DeRay Davis as Pat
- Lil Duval as Darius
- Faizon Love as Rollin' Reg
- Zulay Henao as Madison
- Raquel Lee as Terri
- Martin Starr as Conspiracy Chris
- Lin Shaye as Mrs. Gilliam
- Charlamagne Tha God as Black Jesus
- Shawn Fonteno as Bam
- Alice Hunter as Kirby

== Soundtrack ==
Grow House (Original Motion Picture Soundtrack), containing hip hop music, was released on April 20, 2017, via Grow Room Productions. It features contributions from Snoop Dogg, Lil Duval, Wiz Khalifa, Cypress Hill, Curt Chambers, Devin the Dude, Fredwreck, Garrick Grout, Kurupt, Money Hungry, Wyann Vaughn and Xzibit. KJ Conteh-produced "Kush Ups" previously appeared on Snoop Dogg's 2016 album Coolaid with music video was directed by Dan Folger. Music video for "Kill 'Em Wit The Shoulders" was released in 2016. Music video for DJ Muggs-produced "Reefer Man" was directed by Anthony Hayward; the song was later included in Elephants on Acid. The song "420 (Blaze Up)" also appeared in Neva Left.

Track listing

No.	Title	Writer(s)	Length
1.	"Bong Song" (performed by B-Real, Xzibit and Garrick Grout)	Louis Freese; Alvin Joiner; Garrick Grout; Farid Nassar	3:42
2.	"Inferno" (performed by Kurupt and Fredwreck)	Ricardo Brown; Nassar	3:43
3.	"Kill 'Em Wit the Shoulders" (performed by Snoop Dogg and Lil Duval)	Roland Powell	3:10
4.	"Reefer Man" (performed by Cypress Hill)	Freese; Lawrence Muggerud; Kory Garnett	3:30
5.	"Grass Is Greener" (performed by Curt Chambers)	Curt Chambers; Ivan Barias; Robert Allen	4:07
6.	"Kush Ups" (performed by Snoop Dogg and Wiz Khalifa)	Calvin Broadus	4:00
7.	"Bedizen" (performed by Money Hungry)	Adalyes Allen	4:18
8.	"Nic Nac" (performed by Lil Duval)	Shon Lawson	2:28
9.	"420 (Blaze Up)" (performed by Snoop Dogg, Devin the Dude and Wiz Khalifa)	Broadus; Devin Copeland; Cameron Jibril Thomaz; Kevin Gilliam; Lamar Edwards	4:25
10.	"You Got Me" (performed by Wyann Vaughn)	Wyann Vaughn; Patrick Douthit; Terrace Martin	4:56
Total length:			38:19

== See also ==
- List of hood films
