= Turn Me Loose (Ledisi album) =

Studio album by Ledisi
- Released: August 18, 2009
- Length: 53:53
- Label: Verve
- Producers: Carvin & Ivan; The Fyre Dept.; Jimmy Jam & Terry Lewis; Ledisi; Rex Rideout; Raphael Saadiq; Johnnie Smith; Chucky Thompson; James Wright; Chief Xcel

Ledisi chronology
It's Christmas (2008)	Turn Me Loose (2009)	Pieces of Me (2011)

Turn Me Loose is the fifth studio album by American singer Ledisi. It was released by Verve Records on August 18, 2009 in the United States. It was recorded after Ledisi's experience with writer's block, which she was able to overcome after finding inspiration by listening on the Buddy Miles's album Them Changes (1970). In contrast to her previous work with jazz and soul influences, the album features a prominent funk sound.

The album debuted at number 14 on the US Billboard 200 chart, selling 27,000 copies in the first week. Upon its release, it received generally positive reviews from music critics, based on an aggregate score of 72/100 from Metacritic. Turn Me Loose received two nominations at the 52nd Grammy Awards including Best R&B Album.

== Background ==
Speaking in April 2010 to Blues & Soul, Ledisi explained how the title of the album reflected its musical diversity: "The title 'Turn Me Loose' is basically me saying 'I don't wanna be boxed in! Let me be myself as a performer and singer, because I do EVERYTHING! Not just one particular style!'." The singer was able to secure some of urban music's most respected producers, including Raphael Saadiq, Jimmy Jam & Terry Lewis and James "Big Jim" Wright. She also reunited with producer Rex Rideout, who contributed greatly to the sound of her previous album Lost & Found. With help from the four other producers, including Carvin & Ivan, Chief Xcel, Chucky Thompson, and Fyre Dept., the artist braided brilliant strains of rock, blues, classic soul, funk and hip-hop are all fused together throughout Turn Me Loose. The funky title track, for instance, updates the sassy grooves of vintage Stax. As a tribute to Buddy Miles, Ledisi does a cover of "Them Changes" as a bonus track.

== Critical reception ==
Professional ratings
Aggregate scores
Source	Rating
Metacritic	72/100
Review scores
Source	Rating
About.com	3.5/5 stars
AllMusic	4/5 stars
Boston Herald	B+
Los Angeles Times	2/4 stars
Miami Herald	3/4 stars
People	3.5/4 stars
PopMatters	7/10

At Metacritic, which assigns a normalized rating out of 100 to reviews from mainstream critics, Turn Me Loose has an average score of 72 based on 5 reviews, indicating "generally favorable reviews". AllMusic editor Andy Kellman found that Turn Me Loose "partially roots itself in the singer's past work and otherwise branches out from it [...] Most of the material that is in the vein of the subdued, sophisticated R&B showcased throughout much of Soulsinger and Lost & Found is fine, if sporadically tepid – something that really comes through when heard with the harder material."

Aidin Vaziri, writing for The San Francisco Chronicle, felt that Turn Me Loose was "livelier and more modern sounding than anything she's done before [but] it's her clear vocals, glass-shattering high notes and life-affirming melodies that remain the main attraction, revealing the kind of substance and unfettered spirit of Mary J. Blige at her battle-scarred best." New York Times critic Nate Chinen noted that Turn Me Loose had "its share of kiss-offs and entreaties — Ledisi can manage both, though vulnerability eludes her," while Mariel Concepcion from Billboard found that Turn Me Loose serves as Ledisi's "official coming-out party" and concluded: "Like a true woman, Ledisi keeps growing as she takes the good with the bad."

== Commercial performance ==
The album debuted at number 14 on the US Billboard 200 chart, selling 27,000 copies in the first week.

== Track listing ==
Turn Me Loose track listing
No.	Title	Writer(s)	Producer(s)	Length
1.	"Runnin'"	Ledisi Young; Xavier Mosley	Chief Xcel	2:18
2.	"Everything Changes"	Young; Chucky Thompson	Ledisi; Thompson	4:00
3.	"Turn Me Loose"	Young; Rex Rideout	Rideout	4:18
4.	"Higher Than This"	James Harris III; Terry Lewis; Young; James Wright	Jimmy Jam & Terry Lewis; Wright^{[A]}	4:54
5.	"Alone"	Young; Carvin Haggins; Ivan Barias; Johnnie Smith; Curt Chambers	Carvin & Ivan	4:18
6.	"Love Never Changes"	Young; Raphael Saadiq	Saadiq; Ledisi^{[A]}	3:50
7.	"Please Stay"	Young; Saadiq	Saadiq; Ledisi^{[A]}	3:47
8.	"Knockin'"	Young; Adam Deitch; Eric Krasno	Fyre Dept.	3:45
9.	"Say No"	Young; Deitch; Krasno	Fyre Dept.	3:43
10.	"Goin' Thru Changes"	Young; Rideout	Rideout	4:45
11.	"I Need Love"	Young; Haggins; Barias; Smith	Carvin & Ivan; Smith	4:01
12.	"Trippin'"	Young; Thompson; Kyonte Vincent	Thompson	2:57
13.	"The Answer to Why"	Young; Lorenzo Johnson	Rideout	3:04
14.	"Them Changes"	Buddy Miles	Rideout	4:37

iTunes bonus track
No.	Title	Length
15.	"Movin' On"	4:04

Notes

^{^[A]} denotes co-producer

== Personnel ==
- Ledisi – vocals, backing vocals (1, 2, 4, 6, 7), vocal arrangements (1), horn arrangements (14)
- Hervé Salters – synthesizers (1), clavinet (1), organ (1)
- Teak Underdue – synthesizers (1), guitars (1), bass (1)
- Rex Rideout – acoustic piano (3, 10, 13, 14), Rhodes electric piano (3, 10, 13, 14), keyboards (3, 10, 13, 14), programming (3, 10, 13, 14), horn arrangements (3)
- DeWayne Swan – organ (3, 10, 13, 14)
- Big Jim Wright – keyboards (4)
- John Jackson – Rhodes electric piano (4), percussion (4)
- Johnnie Smith – keyboards (5), programming (11), instruments (11)
- Ivan Barias – programming (5, 11), all other instruments (5), instruments (11)
- Raphael Saddiq – organ (6), guitars (6, 7), bass (6, 7), drums (6, 7), backing vocals (6, 7), keyboards (7), percussion (7)
- Adam Deitch – organ (8), drums (8, 9), keyboards (9)
- Nigel Hall – additional keyboards (9), Moog synthesizer (9)
- David James – additional guitars (1), backing vocals (1)
- Errol Cooney – guitars (3, 10, 14)
- Curt Chambers – guitars (5)
- Eric Krasno – guitars (8, 9), bass (8, 9)
- Michael Ripoll – guitars (13)
- Dwayne "Smitty" Smith – bass (3, 10, 13, 14)
- Michael Urbano – additional drums (1)
- Teddy Campbell – drums (3, 10, 13, 14)
- Iz Avila – drums (4)
- Everette Harp – tenor saxophone (3, 14)
- Nick Lane – trombone (3, 14), horn arrangements (14)
- Steve Madaio – trumpet (3, 14)
- Chief Xcel – arrangements (1)
- Kyonte Vincent – backing vocals (2)
- Lauren Evans – backing vocals (4)
- Mabvuto Carpenter – backing vocals (13)
- Tiffany Smith – backing vocals (13)

Strings on "The Answer to Why"

- Nick Lane – arrangements and conductor
- Timothy Loo and Elizabeth Wright – cello
- Alma Fernandez and Luke Maurer – viola
- Joel Derouin, Julian Hallmark, Joel Pargman and Shalini Vijayan – violin

== Production ==
- Ledisi Young – executive producer, A&R direction
- Bill Darlington – executive producer, A&R direction, management
- Bruce Resnikoff – executive producer
- Dahlia Ambach-Caplin – A&R direction
- Evelyn Morgan – A&R administrator
- Stacy Turner – production coordinator (3, 10, 13, 14)
- Lisa Hansen – release coordinator
- Andy Kman – release coordinator
- John Newcott – release coordinator
- Hollis King – art direction
- Philip Manning – graphic design
- Jack Guy – photography
- Nonja McKenzie – stylist
- Michelle London – hair
- Nicole Caldwell – make-up
- Mark Kaplan – business management
- Deidre Dooley – management assistant
- Evan Krauss – legal representative

Technical credits

- Chris Gehringer – mastering at Sterling Sound (New York, NY)
- Kim Burse – album sequencing
- Mike Cresswell – mixing (1)
- Kyonte Vincent – recording (2, 12)
- John Phipps – mixing (2, 12)
- Rex Rideout – recording (3, 10, 13, 14)
- Ray Bardani – mixing (3, 10, 13, 14)
- Tremaine Williams – recording (4)
- Matt Marrin – mixing (4)
- Ivan Barias – recording (5, 11), mixing (5, 11)
- Carvin Haggins – recording (5)
- Gerry Brown – mixing (6, 7)
- Marlon Marcel – recording (6, 7), mix assistant (6, 7)
- Eric Krasno – recording (8, 9)
- Ari Raskin – mixing (8, 9)
- Brendan Dekora – mix assistant (3, 10, 13, 14)
- Jeff Kaman – recording assistant (3, 10, 14)
- Alby Cohen – recording assistant (8, 9)
- Mike Jinno – recording assistant (8, 9)

== Charts ==
=== Weekly charts ===
Weekly chart performance for Turn Me Loose
Chart (2009)	Peak position
US Billboard 200	14
US Indie Store Album Sales (Billboard)	13
US Top Album Sales (Billboard)	14
US Top Current Album Sales (Billboard)	14
US Top R&B/Hip-Hop Albums (Billboard)	1

=== Year-end charts ===
2009 Year-end chart performance for Turn Me Loose
Chart (2009)	Position
US Top R&B/Hip-Hop Albums (Billboard)	76

2009 Year-end chart performance for Turn Me Loose
Chart (2010)	Position
US Top R&B/Hip-Hop Albums (Billboard)	86
