= Higher Than This =

2009 single by Ledisi

Single by Ledisi

from the album Turn Me Loose
- Released: July 28, 2009
- Genre: R&B, soul
- Length: 4:54
- Label: Verve Forecast
- Songwriter(s): James Samuel Harris III; Terry Steven Lewis; James Wright; Ledisi Young
- Producer(s): Jimmy Jam and Terry Lewis; James "Big Jim" Wright

Ledisi singles chronology
"Goin' Thru Changes" (2009)	"Higher Than This" (2009)	"Everything Changes" (2009)

Music video
- "Higher Than This" on YouTube

"Higher Than This" is a song recorded by American singer-songwriter Ledisi for her fifth studio album Turn Me Loose (2009). The song was written by Ledisi in collaboration with production duo Jimmy Jam and Terry Lewis, and James "Big Jim" Wright. The song was released as the second single from Turn Me Loose on July 28, 2009, by Verve Forecast.

An accompanying music video was directed by Malcom Beckford. Ledisi performed the song on the third season of Sunday Best.

== Commercial performance ==
"Higher Than This" peaked at number sixty-three on the US Hot R&B/Hip-Hop Songs chart during the week of February 13, 2010. "Higher Than This" was more successful on the Adult R&B Songs chart where it peaked at number twenty-two in its fifth week on the chart.

== Track listing ==
- Digital download
1. "Higher Than This"

== Credits and personnel ==
Credits are adapted from the Turn Me Loose liner notes.

- Vocals: Ledisi Young
- Backing Vocals: Lauren Evans
- Production: – Jimmy Jam and Terry Lewis
- Keyboards, production – James "Big Jim" Wright
- Drums – Issiah J. Avila
- Electric piano, percussion – John Jackson
- Mixed by: Matt Marrin
- Recorded by: Tremaine Williams

== Charts ==
Weekly chart performance for "Higher Than This"
Chart (2009)	Peak position
US Adult R&B Songs (Billboard)	22
US Hot R&B/Hip-Hop Songs (Billboard)	63
