= Aijuswanaseing =

Studio album by Musiq Soulchild
- Released: November 14, 2000
- Recorded: 1998–2000
- Genre: R&B, neo soul
- Length: 64:50
- Label: Def Soul; 548289
- Producer: Vidal Davis & Andre Harris, Scratch, Carvin "Ransum" Haggins & Ivan "Orthodox" Barias, Vikter Duplaix, Osunlade, James Poyser

Musiq Soulchild chronology
Aijuswanaseing (2000)	Juslisen (2002)

Singles from Aijuswanaseing
- 1. "Just Friends" Released: August 29, 2000; 2. "Love" Released: December 25, 2000; 3. "Girl Next Door" Released: May 22, 2001

Professional ratings
Review scores
Source	Rating
AllMusic	3/5 stars
BBC Music	favorable
NME	(Odell) (Ward)
PopMatters	favorable
Q	3/5 stars
Rhapsody	favorable
Rolling Stone	3/5 stars
Yahoo! Music	favorable

Aijuswanaseing (pronounced as "I Just Wanna Sing") is the debut studio album by American singer Musiq Soulchild. It was released on November 14, 2000, through Def Soul Recordings and Island Def Jam Music Group. The album debuted at number 32 on the US Billboard 200 chart on December 2, 2000. On the Billboard 200, it peaked at No. 24 on April 7, 2001, and after spending 41 weeks on the chart, exited on September 8, 2001; on the Top R&B/Hip-Hop albums chart, it spent 67 weeks, falling off on June 1, 2002.

== Track listing ==
No.	Title	Writer(s)	Producer(s)	Length
1.	"Scratch Introlude"	Kyle Jones	Scratch	0:46
2.	"Girl Next Door" (featuring Ayana)	Taalib Johnson, Andre Harris, Carvin Haggins, Jill Scott, Ed Green	Andre Harris, Carvin Haggins	4:46
3.	"You And Me"	Johnson, Harris, Haggins, Pat Metheny	Carvin Haggins, Andre Harris	4:20
4.	"Just Friends (Sunny)"	Johnson, Haggins, Ivan Barias, Vidal Davis, Bobby Hebb	Ivan "Orthodox" Barias & Carvin "Ransum" Haggins	4:11
5.	"Mary Go Round"	Johnson, Eric Roberson, Osunlade	Osunlade	3:41
6.	"143"	Johnson, Haggins, Keith Pelzer	Keith Pelzer, Carvin Haggins	4:58
7.	"Love"	Johnson, Harris, Haggins	Andre Harris, Carvin Haggins	5:05
8.	"My Girl"	Johnson, Junius Bervine, Ed King, James Poyser, Haggins	James Poyser, Vikter Duplaix	3:20
9.	"Musiq Soulchild's Theme Song (Intermission)"	Johnson, Wyclef Jean, Jerry Duplessis, Milton Brand	Self	1:25
10.	"Seventeen"	Johnson, Haggins, Harris, George Winston	Carvin Haggins, Andre Harris	3:23
11.	"L' is Gone?" (featuring Ayana)	Johnson, Haggins, Tariq Trotter, Kamal Gray, Leonard Hubbard, Mercedes Martinez, Tracey Moore, Ahmir Thompson	Musiq Soulchild	3:20
12.	"Speechless"	Johnson, Jones	Scratch	3:24
13.	"Poparatzi"	Johnson, Haggins, Barias, C. Wright, Y. Rahman	Ivan "Orthodox" Barias & Carvin "Ransum" Haggins	3:58
14.	"Settle For My Love" (featuring AAries)	Sheree Brown, Patrice Rushen, Freddie Washington	Osunlade	5:40
15.	"You Be Alright"	Johnson, A. Livingston, C. Robeteou	James Poyser, Vikter Duplaix, Musiq Soulchild	7:00

Special edition bonus tracks
No.	Title	Length
16.	"Aimewitue"
17.	"The Ingredients of Love" (duet with Angie Stone)

• other versions replace the track "The Ingredients of Love" duet with Angie Stone with "North Star".

== Personnel ==
- AAries - Primary Artist
- Louis Alfred III - Engineer
- Kwaku Alston - Photography
- Ayana - Primary Artist, Vocals, Vocals (Background)
- Ayinke - Vocals, Vocals (Background)
- Ivan "Orthodox" Barias - Composer, Producer
- Junius Bervine - Keyboards, Producer
- S. Brown - Composer
- Rob Chiarelli - Mixing
- Commissioner Gordon - Mixing
- V. Davis - Composer
- Vidal Davis - Drums, Keyboards
- Vikter Duplaix - Drum Programming, Mixing, Producer
- Russell Elevado - Mixing
- Şerban Ghenea - Engineer, Mixing
- Larry Gold - String Arrangements, String Conductor
- Akisia Grigsby - Art Direction, Design
- Carvin "Ransum" Haggins - Composer
- A. Harris - Composer
- Andre Harris - Keyboards, Producer, Strings
- Bobby Hebb - Composer
- Jerome Hipps - Executive Producer
- Leonard Hubbard - Bass
- T. Johnson - Composer
- K. Jones - Composer
- Ben Kenney - Bass (Electric)
- Ed King - Drum Programming, Engineer, Producer
- Pete Kuzma - Keyboards, Piano
- Steve Manning - Mixing
- Magdaleno Martinez - Composer
- Michael McArthur - Executive Producer
- T. Moore - Composer
- Musiq Soulchild - Executive Producer, Keyboards, Primary Artist, Vocal Arrangement, Vocals, Vocals (Background)
- Osunlade - Bass, Composer, Drums, Fender Rhodes, Producer
- Pino Palladino - Bass
- Keith Pelzer - Engineer, Vocal Arrangement
- Isaac Phillips - Guitar
- James Poyser - Keyboards, Organ, Producer, Wurlitzer
- Tony Prendatt - Mixing
- Eric Roberson - Vocal Arrangement, Vocals (Background)
- Francesco Romano - Guitar
- Jill Scott - Vocal Arrangement
- Jon Smeltz - Engineer
- Storm - Engineer
- Frank Sutton - Engineer
- Eric Tribbett - Drums

== Charts ==
=== Weekly charts ===
Chart (2001)	Peak position
US Billboard 200	24
US Top R&B/Hip-Hop Albums (Billboard)	4

=== Year-end charts ===
Chart (2001)	Position
US Billboard 200	56
US Top R&B/Hip-Hop Albums (Billboard)	4

== Certifications ==
Region	Certification	Certified units/sales
United States (RIAA)	Platinum	1,000,000^{^}
^{^} Shipments figures based on certification alone.
