= Luvanmusiq =

Studio album by Musiq Soulchild
- Released: March 13, 2007
- Length: 48:57
- Label: Atlantic; Soulstar; Soli Ridge
- Producer: Carvin & Ivan; Harold Lilly; Jake and the Phatman; Lab Ratz; Raphael Saadiq; The Underdogs; Theron "Neff-U" Feemster; Warryn Campbell

Musiq Soulchild chronology
Soulstar (2003)	Luvanmusiq (2007)	OnMyRadio (2008)

Luvanmusiq (pronounced Lovin' Musiq) is the fourth studio album by the singer-songwriter Musiq Soulchild, the first under his contract with Atlantic Records. The lead single, "B.U.D.D.Y.", was released to US radio in late November 2006; it reached number two on the R&B chart, and number 36 on the Billboard Hot 100. Following its release, it entered the US Billboard 200 at number 1, with 149,774 copies sold. During the same week, the second single, "Teachme", entered the US Hot R&B/Hip-Hop Songs chart at number 54, and rose to number five in its thirteenth week. "Teachme" also entered the Hot 100 at number 92 on the issue date, May 26, 2007.

The third single from the album was "Makeyouhappy", first said in an entry on Soulchild's MySpace blog. The song entered the Hot R&B/Hip-hop Songs chart, peaking at number 61. The album was nominated for Best R&B Album at the 50th Grammy Awards.

== Critical reception ==
Professional ratings
Review scores
Source	Rating
About.com	3/5 stars
AllMusic	4/5 stars
DJBooth	3.5/5 stars
Entertainment Weekly	B
Metromix	4/5 stars
USA Today	3.5/4 stars

Luvanmusiq received positive reviews from music critics. AllMusic editor Andy Kellman gave note of the record's short running time allowing equal attention for each track and the overall throwback aesthetic being the same as Musiq's previous efforts and not containing "insincere trend-hopping or ill-fitting collaborations with hot MCs." He concluded that "[T]hey're neither raunchy nor drab, and they're nearly a lost art form in 2007." DJBooth's Nathan Slavik gave praise to the musicianship feeling mature throughout the record's track list of slow jams and crowd pleasers, despite the former's combination of lush minimalism and sincere lyricism coming across as "background music." He concluded that, "If Musiq’s sole intention for this album was to remind us he’s alive, mission accomplished. Luvanmusiq has several solid tracks, and a couple excellent ones, but as a whole it falls just short of excellent." Mark Edward Nero from About.com gave a mixed review of the album, commending Musiq for remaining consistent in terms of his "soft, deliberate vocal style" and penchant for romantic ballads but felt that it comes across as though he's shown "little creative growth as a singer." He highlighted the tracks "Betterman", "Makeyouhappy" and "Ridiculous" for having enough content to stand alongside the first single "B.U.D.D.Y." and showcasing Musiq's continued talent as "one of the better R&B songwriters in the business today", concluding that "Although Luvanmusiq rates pretty low in the excitement and thrills departments, if you take the time to listen to it repeatedly, it's an album whose subtle romantic charm grows on you."

== Commercial performance ==
The album opened at number one on the US Billboard 200, with first week sales of 149,000 copies, becoming his second chart topper after Juslisen (2002). It also marked his second number one album on the Top R&B/Hip-Hop Albums chart. On June 7, 2007, Luvanmusiq was certified Gold by the Recording Industry Association of America (RIAA) for shipment figures in excess of 500,000 units.

== Track listing ==
Luvanmusiq track listing
No.	Title	Writer(s)	Producer(s)	Length
1.	"B.U.D.D.Y."	Taalib Johnson; Carvin Haggins; Cornelius Church; Earl Guinn; Kenton Nix	Lab Ratz	3:45
2.	"Ms.Philadelphia"	Johnson; Shaffer Smith; Solmon Ridge. Jr.; Curtis "Sauce" Wilson	Wilson; Musiq Soulchild	3:56
3.	"Teachme"	Haggins; Corey Latif Williams; Ivan Barias; J. Smith	Carvin & Ivan	4:22
4.	"Better Man"	Johnson; Raphael Saadiq; Robert Ozuna; Kelvin Wooten	Saadiq; Jake and the Phatman	4:39
5.	"Thequestions"	Johnson; Harold Lilly	Musiq Soulchild; Theron Feemster	3:11
6.	"Today"	Johnson; Antonio Dixon; Harvey Mason, Jr.; Damon Thomas	The Underdogs	4:04
7.	"Makeyouhappy"	Johnson; Warryn Campbell	Campbell	3:20
8.	"Ridiculous"	Johnson; Bryan James Sledge; Campbell	Campbell	3:48
9.	"Millionaire"	Johnson; Lilly; Marc Gordon; Feemster	Feemster; Harold Lilly	3:54
10.	"Takeyouthere"	Johnson; Campbell	Campbell	4:55
11.	"Lullaby"	Johnson; Haggins; Church; Kairi J. Guinn; E. Guinn; Allan Wayne Felder; James Grant	Lab Ratz	4:19
12.	"Greatestlove"	Johnson; Campbell	Campbell	4:46

Bonus track
No.	Title	Writer(s)	Producer(s)	Length
13.	"Rewind" (bonus track)	Johnson; Haggins	Carvin & Ivan	3:06
14.	"B.U.D.D.Y." (remix featuring Ja Rule and Fat Joe)	Johnson; Haggins; Church; E. Guinn; Nix; Jeffrey Atkins; Joseph Cartagena	Lab Ratz	4:28

Bonus tracks

1. "Ooo Baby Baby" – 3:02 (Circuit City bonus track)
2. "Movin' On" – 4:11 (AOL Black Voices exclusive track)
3. "Allaboutyou" – 2:52 (Best Buy bonus track)
4. "Ridethrough" – 3:06 (Best Buy bonus track)
5. "Slowdown" – 3:50 (Best Buy bonus track)
6. "Rewind" – 3:08 (iTunes bonus track)

Samples

- "B.U.D.D.Y." contains interpolations from the Taana Gardner song "Heartbeat".
- "Lullaby" contains elements from the Blue Magic song "Stop to Start".
- "Ms.Philadelphia" contains elements from "Overjoyed" by Stevie Wonder.

== Personnel ==
- Ivan "Orthodox" Barias – composer, engineer, executive producer, producer, tracking, vocal producer
- Adam Blackstone – bass
- Randy Bowland – guitar
- Bruce Buechner – engineer
- Greg Gigendad Burke – art direction
- Sandra Campbell – project coordinator
- Warryn Campbell – composer, instrumentation, keyboards, piano, producer, vocal producer, backing vocals
- Sean Cooper – sound design
- Eric Dawkins – vocals, backing vocals
- Tony Dixon – vocal producer
- Theron "Neff U" Feemster – bass, drums, instrumentation, keyboards, producer
- Allan Felder – composer
- Miguel Gandelman – horn
- Chris Gehringer – mastering
- Serban Ghenea – mixing
- Marc Gordon – composer
- James Grant – composer
- Victor Jason Greig – executive producer
- Earl Guinn – composer
- Carvin "Ransum" Haggins – composer, engineer, executive producer, producer, tracking, vocal producer
- John Hanes – digital editing
- Ayana Hipps – backing vocals
- Jerome Hipps – executive producer
- Jake & the Phatman – producer
- Lab Ratz – instrumentation, producer
- Kevin Liles – executive producer, executive vice president
- Harold Lilly – composer, producer, vocal producer, backing vocals
- Riley Mackin – assistant engineer
- Harvey Mason, Jr. – composer
- Michael McArthur – executive producer
- George "Spanky" McCurdy – drums
- Wesley Morrow – production coordination
- Musiq Soulchild – arranger, composer, executive producer, keyboards, primary artist, producer, rhythm, vocal producer, vocals, backing vocals
- Ne-Yo – vocal producer
- Kenton Nix – composer
- Benjamin O'Neil "Benanas" – guitar
- Robert Ozuna – composer, drums, percussion, scratching
- Joi L. Pitts – product manager
- Aaron Renner – engineer
- Tim Roberts – assistant
- Nick Romei – packaging manager
- Raphael Saadiq – bass, composer, guitar, keyboards, producer
- Shaffer Smith – composer
- Glenn Standridge – engineer
- Frank Sutton – engineer, tracking
- John Tanksley – production coordination
- James Tanskley – assistant engineer
- Damon Thomas – composer
- The Underdogs – instrumentation, producer
- Ben Watts – photography
- Corey Williams – composer
- Curtis "Sauce" Wilson – arranger, composer, drums, keyboards, producer, programming, rhythm
- Dontae Winslow – horn
- Kelvin Wooten – keyboards
- Yuan – design
- Andrew Zaeh – art producer

== Charts ==
=== Weekly charts ===
Weekly chart performance for Luvanmusiq
Chart (2007)	Peak position
US Billboard 200	1
US Top R&B/Hip-Hop Albums (Billboard)	1

=== Year-end charts ===
Year-end chart performance for Luvanmusiq
Chart (2007)	Position
US Billboard 200	99
US Top R&B/Hip-Hop Albums (Billboard)	17

== Certifications ==
Certifications for Luvanmusiq
Region	Certification	Certified units/sales
United States (RIAA)	Gold	500,000^{^}
^{^} Shipments figures based on certification alone.
