= Nothing at All (Santana song) =

2003 single by Santana

Single by Santana featuring Musiq Soulchild

from the album Shaman
- Released: January 21, 2003
- Length: 4:28
- Label: Arista
- Songwriters: Rob Thomas; Cory Rooney
- Producers: Cory Rooney; Dan Shea

Santana singles chronology
"The Game of Love" (2002)	"Nothing at All" (2003)	"Feels Like Fire" (2003)

Musiq Soulchild singles chronology
"Dontchange" (2003)	"Nothing at All" (2003)	"Forthenight" (2004)

"Nothing at All" is a song by American rock band Santana, released as the second single from their 19th studio album, Shaman (2002), in January 2003. The song was written by Matchbox Twenty's Rob Thomas along with Cory Rooney and features Musiq Soulchild on vocals. Produced by Rooney and Dan Shea, the song charted only in Switzerland, peaking at number 74 on the Schweizer Hitparade. The music video was directed by Marc Webb, with the female lead played by Joy Bryant and the male lead played by actor Andre Warmsley.

== Charts ==
Weekly chart performance for "Nothing at All"
Chart (2003)	Peak position
Switzerland (Schweizer Hitparade)	74

== Certifications ==
Certifications for "Nothing at All"
Region	Certification	Certified units/sales
United States (RIAA) Video single	Gold	25,000^{^}
^{^} Shipments figures based on certification alone.
