= Just Friends (Sunny) =

Single by Musiq Soulchild

from the album Aijuswanaseing and Nutty Professor II: The Klumps (soundtrack)
- Released: 2000
- Recorded: 1999
- Genre: R&B
- Length: 4:11
- Label: Def Soul
- Songwriters: Carvin Haggins, Bobby Hebb, Taalib Johnson
- Producers: Ivan "Orthodox" Barias & Carvin "Ransum" Haggins

Musiq Soulchild singles chronology
| "Just Friends (Sunny)" (2000) | "Love" (2000) |

"Just Friends (Sunny)" is the first single from Musiq Soulchild's debut album Aijuswanaseing. It was released in 2000 as a 12" single. The song was written for and also included on the soundtrack to the 2000 film Nutty Professor II: The Klumps.

It debuted on the Billboard Hot R&B/Hip-Hop Songs chart on September 9, 2000, spent 37 weeks on the chart (its last being May 19, 2001), and peaked at #6.

"Just Friends (Sunny)" entered the Billboard Hot 100 on October 14, 2000, spending 19 weeks there, peaking at #31 and falling off on February 24, 2001.

Prince with Soulchild recorded a version of "Just Friends (Sunny)" for his 2002 live album, One Nite Alone... Live!.

Drum & Bass artist Dave Owen sampled "Just Friends (Sunny)" for his tune "Loose Lips", released in 2012.
