= Ain't Leavin Without You =

Single by Jaheim

from the album Another Round
- Released: October 23, 2009
- Recorded: 2009
- Genre: R&B
- Length: 3:23; 3:31 (remix w/ Jadakiss)
- Label: Atlantic
- Songwriters: Marcella Precise Brailsford; E. Laues; Balewa Muhammad; Kay Gee
- Producer: KayGee

Jaheim singles chronology
"I've Changed" (2008)	"Ain't Leavin Without You" (2009)	"Finding My Way Back" (2010)

"Ain't Leavin Without You" is a song by American R&B singer Jaheim. It was released to radio on October 23, 2009, and is the first single from his fifth studio album, Another Round. It was produced by his longtime producer Naughty by Nature's KayGee. Songwriting duties were handled by Marcella "Precise" Brailsford, the Clutch's Balewa Muhammad and Eritza Laues. The song was inspired by an encounter with a girl that Jaheim had in a club. It samples De La Soul's hit single "Ring Ring Ring (Ha Ha Hey)" which contains portions of the Whatnauts' "Help Is on the Way".

== Remix ==
The official remix features rapper and longtime friend Jadakiss, it was released on January 5, 2010. It is the final track on Another Round.

== Music video ==
A video for the remix of Ain't Leavin Without You featuring Jadakiss was shot in January 2010 in New York City. It was released on the Atlantic Records YouTube page on February 5, 2010.

== Charts ==
=== Weekly charts ===
Chart (2010)	Peak position
US Adult R&B Songs (Billboard)	1
US Billboard Hot 100	93
US Hot R&B/Hip-Hop Songs (Billboard)	12

=== Year-end charts ===
Chart (2010)	Position
US Adult R&B Songs (Billboard)	7
