= Goin' Thru Changes =

2009 single by Ledisi

Single by Ledisi

from the album Turn Me Loose
- Released: July 7, 2009
- Genre: R&B
- Length: 4:45
- Label: Verve Forecast
- Songwriters: Rex Rideout; Ledisi Young
- Producer: Rex Rideout

Ledisi singles chronology
"Give Love on Christmas Day" (2008)	"Goin' Thru Changes" (2009)	"Higher Than This" (2009)

Music video
- "Goin' Thru Changes" on YouTube

"Goin' Thru Changes" is a song recorded by American singer-songwriter Ledisi for her fifth studio album Turn Me Loose (2009). The song was released as lead single from Turn Me Loose on July 7, 2009, by Verve Forecast.

An accompanying music video was directed by Claire Carré. The video follows a sultry-themed silhouette with Ledisi being tempted and enticed by another man aside from her lover. "Goin' Thru Changes" was nominated for Best Female R&B Vocal Performance at the 52nd Annual Grammy Awards in 2010.

== Commercial performance ==
"Goin' Thru Changes" debuted at the US Hot R&B/Hip-Hop Songs chart at number ninety-three during the week of August 1, 2009. After sixteen weeks on the chart, the song peaked at number forty-three during the week of November 21, 2009. "Goin' Thru Changes" was more successful on the Adult R&B Songs chart where it peaked at number fifteen.

== Track listing ==
- Digital download
1. "Goin' Thru Changes"

== Credits and personnel ==
Credits are adapted from the Turn Me Loose liner notes.

- Vocals: Ledisi Young
- Guitar: Errol Cooney
- Bass guitar: Dwayne "Smitty" Smith
- Organ: DeWayne Swan
- Drums: Teddy Campbell
- Piano, production, recording: Rex Rideout
  - Assisted by: Jeff Kaman
- Coordinator (Production): Stacy Turner
- Mix engineers: Ray Bardani
  - Assisted by: Brendan Dekora

== Charts ==
Weekly chart performance for "Goin' Thru Changes"
Chart (2009)	Peak position
US Adult R&B Songs (Billboard)	15
US Hot R&B/Hip-Hop Songs (Billboard)	45
