= Finding My Way Back =

Single by Jaheim

from the album Another Round
- Released: January 22, 2010
- Recorded: 2009
- Genre: R&B
- Length: 3:49 (album version): 3:32 (radio version)
- Label: Atlantic
- Songwriters: Miguel Jontel; Carvin Haggins; Ivan Barias; Curt Chambers; Jaheim
- Producers: Ivan "Orthodox" Barias; Carvin "Ransum" Haggins

Jaheim singles chronology
"Ain't Leavin Without You" (2009)	"Finding My Way Back" (2010)	"Unknown" (2010)

"Finding My Way Back" is a song by Jaheim. It was released on January 22, 2010 and is the second single from his album, Another Round. It was produced by Ivan "Orthodox" Barias and Carvin "Ransum" Haggins. It reached No. 12 on the Billboard Hot R&B/Hip-Hop Songs chart and No. 95 on the Billboard Hot 100.

== Charts ==
=== Weekly charts ===
Chart (2010)	Peak position
US Billboard Hot 100	95
US Adult R&B Songs (Billboard)	2
US Hot R&B/Hip-Hop Songs (Billboard)	12

=== Year-end charts ===
Chart (2010)	Position
US Adult R&B Songs (Billboard)	2
US Hot R&B/Hip-Hop Songs (Billboard)	28
