= Girl Next Door (Musiq Soulchild song) =

2001 single by Musiq Soulchild

Single by Musiq Soulchild

from the album Aijuswanaseing
- Released: May 22, 2001
- Recorded: 2000
- Genre: R&B, soul
- Length: 4:46
- Label: Def Soul
- Songwriters: Edward Prince Green, Carvin Haggins, Taalib Johnson, Jill Scott
- Producers: Andre Harris, Carvin Haggins

Musiq Soulchild singles chronology
"Love" (2000)	"Girl Next Door" (2001)	"Halfcrazy" (2002)

"Girl Next Door" is the third and final single from Musiq Soulchild's debut album Aijuswanaseing. It was released as a 12" single on May 15, 2001.

It debuted on the Billboard Hot R&B/Hip-Hop Songs chart on January 20, 2001, spent 23 non-consecutive weeks on the chart (its last being October 20, 2001), and peaked at #28.

"Girl Next Door" entered the Billboard Hot 100 on August 25, 2001, spending 8 consecutive weeks there, peaking at #85 and falling off on October 13, 2001.

== Music video ==
The video starts with a young Musiq and his childhood friends walking down the street and eating ice cream in Philadelphia in 1989. The girl with him, Tonya, gets called into the house by her mom. Twelve years later, Musiq goes back to his old neighborhood and meets up with her. He sees how much she has grown up and changed. The video frequently switches back to when they were kids. The video shows them as children playing spin the bottle. At the end young Musiq says "Someday you gon' be my girl". Tonya says "Yeah right" and elbows him.
