= Soulstar (Musiq album) =

Studio album by Musiq
- Released: December 9, 2003
- Studio: Home Cookin' Studios (Philadelphia, Pennsylvania)
- Length: 70:26
- Label: Mama's Boys; Def Soul
- Producer: 88-Keys; Carvin & Ivan; MAD; Junius Bervine; Da Gutta Fam

Musiq chronology
Juslisen (2002)	Soulstar (2003)	Luvanmusiq (2007)

Soulstar is the third studio album by American singer Musiq. It was released by Def Soul on December 9, 2003, in the United States. The album debuted on the Billboard 200 at number thirteen, spending 23 weeks on the chart and exiting on May 29, 2004; on the Top R&B/Hip-Hop Albums chart where it peaked at number three, it spent 37 weeks, falling off on September 9, 2004. Soulstar would be Musiq's final album for the Def Jam roster, before he transitioned to Atlantic in a de facto trade for his next album Luvanmusiq (2007).

== Critical reception ==
Professional ratings
Review scores
Source	Rating
AllMusic	3.5/5 stars
Blender	4/5 stars
Entertainment Weekly	B
USA Today	3.5/4 stars
Vibe	4/5 stars

Soulstar garnered positive reviews from music critics. AllMusic editor Andy Kellman said that despite the length of the record, he praised Musiq's growing musicianship to craft modern R&B tracks that don't carry gimmicks or personas that give his performances on them "a sense of intimacy that many of his contemporaries lack." He concluded by calling it "one of the finest contemporary R&B releases of 2003, with both style and substance in good supply." Raymond Fiore from Entertainment Weekly said of Musiq being able to transcend his "humble-pie persona" amongst the other neo soul artists throughout the album: "But while the former ”Soulchild” is maddeningly predictable, the grooves on Soulstar prove surprisingly rewarding. Just when you think Musiq’s songs remain the same, he unleashes a series of harmonically lush chords that elevate him way above average." Steve Jones of USA Today said, "Although he often wears his Wonder-Hathaway influences on his sleeve, his ever-improving songwriting and vocal phrasings set him apart. Love themes predominate, but his songs often paint detailed scenarios and are anything but simple." In a mixed review for The New York Times, Jon Pareles praised Musiq's lyricism for being reminiscent of '70s Stevie Wonder but was off-put by Ivan Barias' production causing said lyrics in the tracks to "ramble until they begin to sound like recitatives." He later called Soulstar "an album of dense, fascinating textures and articulate lyrics that ends up pleasant but prosy."

== Commercial performance ==
The album debuted and peaked at number 13 on the US Billboard 200, with first week sales of 156,000 copies. It also reached number three on the Top R&B/Hip-Hop Albums chart. On February 17, 2004, Soulstar was certified Gold by the Recording Industry Association of America (RIAA) for shipment figures in excess of 500,000 units.

== Track listing ==
Soulstar track listing
No.	Title	Producer(s)	Length
1.	"Soulstar" (featuring DJ Aktive and Carol Riddick)	MAD	3:02
2.	"Youloveme"	Carvin & Ivan	3:50
3.	"Womanopaly"	Carvin & Ivan	4:55
4.	"Forthenight"	Carvin & Ivan	3:50
5.	"Infatueighties"	Carvin & Ivan	4:36
6.	"Whoknows"	Carvin & Ivan	4:55
7.	"Babymother"	Carvin & Ivan	4:43
8.	"Missyou"	Carvin & Ivan	4:00
9.	"Momentinlife" (featuring Cee Lo Green and Kindred the Family Soul)	Junius Bervine	4:43
10.	"Thereason"	Carvin & Ivan	5:29
11.	"Dontstop/her" (featuring Bilal)	88-Keys	8:08
12.	"Wherareyougoing"	Da Gutta Fam	4:28
13.	"Romancipation"	Carvin & Ivan	4:10
14.	"Interlude"		0:38
15.	"Givemorelove/Leaveamessage"	Carvin & Ivan	9:46

Notes

- The vinyl release of Soulstar has a different track listing from the CD. The songs "Whereareyougoing" and "Leaveamessage" do not appear on the vinyl version of the album.

Sample credits

- "Soulstar" contains a sample of "I Found Love (When I Found You)", as performed by the Spinners
- "Youloveme" contains a sample of "Soft Touch", as performed by Henry Mancini
- "Babymother" contains a sample of "Shadows", as performed by Tom Scott
- "Romancipation" contains a sample of "The Jam", as performed by Graham Central Station
- "Givemorelove" contains a sample of "Getaway Day", as performed by Tom Scott

== Personnel ==
- 88-Keys – producer
- AAries – vocals, backing vocals
- Andre – voices, performer
- Ivan "Orthodox" Barias – arranger, composer, engineer, executive producer, instrumentation, multi instruments, producer, programming, tracking
- Junius Bervine – composer, instrumentation, multi instruments, producer
- Algebra Blessett – telephone voice, voices
- Jeff Bradshaw – trombone
- Matt Cappy – trumpet
- Chad – telephone voice, voices
- Charnee – telephone voice, voices
- Bootsy Collins – telephone voice, voices
- Troy Corbin – backing vocals
- Andre Dandridge – engineer, telephone voice, tracking
- Maurice "DJ Aktive" "The Scratchologist" Deloach – scratching
- Dox – performer, telephone voice, voices
- Vikter Duplaix – percussion, producer
- Erickache – performer, telephone voice, voices
- Roger Erickson – photography
- Chris Gehringer – mastering
- Serban Ghenea – mixing
- Theodore Gilbert – bass
- Larry Graham – composer
- Cee Lo Green – vocal arrangement, vocals, backing vocals, composer
- Akisia Grigsby – art direction, design
- Nicole Guiland – backing vocals
- Gutta Fam – producer, vocal arrangement
- Carvin "Ransum" Haggins – composer, engineer, executive producer, performer, producer, telephone voice, tracking, vocal arrangement, vocal producer, backing vocals, voices
- John Hanes – digital editing
- Heather – performer, telephone voice, voices
- Heiku – producer
- Timothy Hicks – backing vocals
- Jerome Hipps – executive producer
- Mick Jagger – composer
- Terese Joseph – recording director
- Kindred the Family Soul – vocals, backing vocals
- Kenny Lattimore – backing vocals
- John Lawson – drums
- Kevin Liles – executive producer
- M.A.D. – composer, producer
- Henry Mancini – composer
- Michael McArthur – executive producer
- Moms – performer, telephone voice, voices
- Muriyd – performer, telephone voice, voices
- Musiq (Soulchild) – composer, producer, vocal arrangement, vocal producer, vocals, backing vocals
- UE Nastasi – mastering
- Olezski – Fender Rhodes
- Bilal Oliver – composer, telephone voice, vocal arrangement, vocal producer, vocals, backing vocals, voices
- Ben "Benanas" O'Neill – guitar
- Ora – performer, telephone voice, voices
- Pops – performer, telephone voice, voices
- Keith Richards – composer
- Carol Riddick – vocals, backing vocals
- John Roberts – drums, percussion
- Tim Roberts – assistant
- Dawn Robinson – backing vocals
- Franky "Vegas" Romano – composer, arranger, bass, guitar, performer, sitar, telephone voice, voices
- Tom Scott – composer
- James "Jayshawn" Smith – backing vocals
- Johnnie "Smurf" Smith – arranger, instrumentation, keyboards, organ, producer
- Frank "Mumbles" Sullen – engineer, tracking
- Rick Tate Jr. – saxophone
- Torrie – performer, telephone voice, voices
- Thaddeus T. Tribbett – bass
- April Williams – backing vocals
- Levar "Lil' Tone" Wilson – backing vocals

== Charts and certifications ==
=== Weekly charts ===
Weekly chart performance for Soulstar
Chart (2003)	Peak position
Canadian R&B Albums (Nielsen SoundScan)	29
US Billboard 200	13
US Top R&B/Hip-Hop Albums (Billboard)	3

=== Year-end charts ===
Year-end chart performance for Soulstar
Chart (2004)	Position
US Billboard 200	114
US Top R&B/Hip-Hop Albums (Billboard)	21

== Certifications ==
Certifications for Soulstar
Region	Certification	Certified units/sales
United States (RIAA)	Gold	500,000^{^}
^{^} Shipments figures based on certification alone.
