= Buddy (Musiq Soulchild song) =

"B.U.D.D.Y."

Single by Musiq Soulchild

from the album Luvanmusiq
- Released: January 30, 2007
- Recorded: 2006
- Genre: R&B
- Length: 3:54
- Label: Atlantic
- Songwriters: Ivan Barias, Cornelius Eugene Church, Earl Guinn, Kairi J Guinn, Carvin Haggins, Taalib Johnson, Kenton Nix
- Producer: Lab Ratz

Musiq Soulchild singles chronology
| "Whoknows" (2004) | "B.U.D.D.Y." (2007) | "Teachme" (2007) |

Music video
- "B.U.D.D.Y." on YouTube

"B.U.D.D.Y." (pronounced "Buddy") is the first single from Musiq Soulchild's fourth album Luvanmusiq. It was released on January 30, 2007, after being given to radio stations in the US in late November 2006. It contains samples from De La Soul's "Buddy (Native Tongues Decision Remix)", Taana Gardner's "Heartbeat" and interpolations from the composition "Heartbeat (Kenton Mix)". The song was nominated for a Grammy Award for Best Male R&B Vocal Performance at the 50th Grammy Awards but lost to "Future Baby Mama" by Prince. The lyrics are a man's attempts to persuade a girl he can be her "buddy".

== Music video ==
The video is directed by Sanaa Hamri, the video is set in Sunset Junction, Los Angeles where Musiq exits a music shop and sees an attractive woman and asks her if she could be his friend with benefits, listing off the things that he's not and the phrases the song's title means. After both of them meet with their respective friends, they get together at an outdoor late-night party where Musiq performs and brings the woman up on stage to be with him. Kat Graham makes a cameo appearance in the video. The official video was released on his record label's YouTube page on March 5, 2007.

== Remix ==
An official remix featuring NYC rappers Ja Rule, Fat Joe and Jadakiss can also be found on the Internet and it is an iTunes bonus track of the album (Jadakiss is not on the iTunes version of the remix). Additional remixes feature Lupe Fiasco and a separate track produced by Jazze Pha featuring T.I. and Young Buck.

== Chart performance ==
It entered the Billboard Hot R&B/Hip-Hop Songs chart on December 16, 2006, at number 75; in its sixteenth week on March 31, 2007, it peaked at number 2, where it stayed for four consecutive weeks. "B.U.D.D.Y." entered the Billboard Hot 100 on February 10, 2007, at number 100, and reached its peak position at number 36 on April 7, 2007, in its ninth week on the chart. The song was something of a comeback for Musiq, who had not appeared in the R&B top 10 or the Pop top 40 for five years.

== Charts ==
=== Weekly charts ===
| Chart (2007) | Peak position |
|---|---|
| US Billboard Hot 100 | 36 |
| US Hot R&B/Hip-Hop Songs (Billboard) | 2 |
| US Rhythmic Airplay (Billboard) | 38 |

=== Year-end charts ===
| Chart (2007) | Position |
|---|---|
| US Hot R&B/Hip-Hop Songs (Billboard) | 9 |
