= Teachme =

Single by Musiq Soulchild

from the album Luvanmusiq
- Released: March 12, 2007
- Recorded: 2006
- Genre: R&B, soul
- Length: 4:22
- Label: Atlantic
- Songwriters: Ivan Barias, Adam Blackstone, Randall C. Bowland, Carvin Haggins, George "Spanky" McCurdy, Johnnie Smith, Corey Latif Williams
- Producers: Orthodox & Ransum

Musiq Soulchild singles chronology
"B.U.D.D.Y." (2007)	"Teachme" (2007)	"Makeyouhappy" (2007)

"Teachme" is the second single from Musiq Soulchild's fourth album Luvanmusiq.

It debuted on the Billboard Hot R&B/Hip-Hop Songs chart on March 31, 2007 at No. 54, the same week his album, Luvanmusiq, entered the Billboard 200 and the Top R&B/Hip-Hop Albums charts at number one. The song peaked at number two on the Hot R&B/Hip-Hop Songs chart on July 14, 2007, a position it held for a total of five non-consecutive weeks. It tied the record set by Robin Thicke's "Lost Without U" for the longest run at number one on the US Urban AC chart at 13 weeks. Additionally, the song debuted at No. 82 on Billboard Hot 100, peaking at No. 42.

== Music video ==
A music video was released for this song and can be viewed on YouTube. It received moderate airplay on BET and even greater airplay on its sister channel BET J. On December 31, 2007, it appeared at number 92 on BET's Notarized: Top 100 Videos of 2007 countdown.

== Charts ==
=== Weekly charts ===
Chart (2007)	Peak position
US Billboard Hot 100	42
US Hot R&B/Hip-Hop Songs (Billboard)	2

=== Year-end charts ===
Chart (2007)	Position
US Hot R&B/Hip-Hop Songs (Billboard)	5
Chart (2008)	Position
US Hot R&B/Hip-Hop Songs (Billboard)	69
