= Forthenight =

Single by Musiq

from the album Soulstar
- Released: October 7, 2003
- Recorded: 2003
- Genre: R&B
- Length: 4:10
- Label: Def Soul
- Songwriters: Ivan Barias, Carvin Haggins, Taalib Johnson, Johnnie Smith
- Producers: Orthodox & Ransum

Musiq singles chronology
"Nothing at All" (2003)	"Forthenight" (2003)	"Whoknows" (2004)

"Forthenight" is the lead single from Musiq's third album Soulstar. It was released as a 12" single on October 7, 2003.

It debuted on the Billboard Hot R&B/Hip-Hop Songs chart at #77 on October 18, 2003, spent 20 weeks on the chart (its last being February 28, 2004), and peaked at #18. The music video featured Tamikko Beasty as its leading lady.

"Forthenight" entered the Billboard Hot 100 on November 8, 2003, spending 17 weeks there, peaking at #53 and falling off on February 28, 2004.
