= Another Round (album) =

Studio album by Jaheim
- Released: February 9, 2010
- Length: 49:04
- Label: Atlantic
- Producer: Eric Hudson

Jaheim chronology
| The Makings of a Man (2007) | Another Round (2010) | Appreciation Day (2013) |

Singles from Another Round
- 1. "Ain't Leavin Without You" Released: October 23, 2009; 2. "Finding My Way Back" Released: January 22, 2010

Another Round is the fifth studio album by American R&B singer Jaheim. It was released by Atlantic Records on February 9, 2010, in the United States.

== Commercial performance ==
The album debuted at number three on the Billboard 200 and at number two on the Top R&B/Hip-Hop Albums chart, selling 112,000 copies in its first week. So far the album has sold 340,000 in the United States.

== Singles ==
"Ain't Leavin Without You" is the first single from this album. It was released to radio on October 23, 2009. It peaked at #93 on the US Billboard Hot 100 and at #12 on the US Hot R&B/Hip-Hop Songs chart. The remix features rapper Jadakiss. The music video for the remix was released on February 5, 2010.

"Finding My Way Back" is the second single from this album, It was released on January 22, 2010. It peaked at #95 on the US Billboard Hot 100 and at #12 on the US Hot R&B/Hip-Hop Songs chart. The music video for "Finding My Way Back" was released on April 30, 2010.

Professional ratings
Aggregate scores
| Source | Rating |
|---|---|
| Metacritic | (76/100) |
Review scores
| Source | Rating |
| About.com | 3.5/5 stars |
| Allmusic | 3.5/5 stars |
| Billboard | (favorable) |
| The Boston Globe | (positive) |
| DjBooth.net | 4/5 stars |
| Entertainment Weekly | B+ |
| The New York Times | (average) |
| PopMatters | 8/10 stars |
| Sound-Savvy | 3.5/5 stars |
| USA Today | 3/4 stars |

== Track listing ==
| No. | Title | Writer(s) | Producer(s) | Length |
|---|---|---|---|---|
| 1. | "Ain't Leavin Without You" | Keir Gist; Eritza Laues; Marcella Brailsford; Balewa Muhammad; James Stanley Carter; Julian Brookhouse; Miguel Drummond; Skinner Glenn; Nick Thorp; Pierrot Volpeliere | KayGee | 3:21 |
| 2. | "Finding My Way Back" | Carvin "Ransum" Haggins; Ivan "Orthodox" Barias; Miguel Jontel; Curt Chambers; Jaheim Hoagland | Carvin & Ivan | 3:48 |
| 3. | "Whoa" | Hoagland; Muhammad; Cliff Lighty; Darren Lighty; Cory Thomas; Jerod Walker | Jaheim; C. Lighty; Muhammad | 3:48 |
| 4. | "Till It Happens to You" | Hoagland; Gist; Roy Battle; Brailsford; Muhammad; C. Lighty | Battleroy; KayGee | 4:19 |
| 5. | "Bed Is Listening" | Harold Lilly; Chuck Harmony; Muhammad; C. Lighty | Lilly; Harmony | 3:31 |
| 6. | "Impossible" | Hoagland; Jonathan Rotem; Jon Brown; Sly Jordan; Muhammad; C. Lighty; Calvin Lewis; Andrew Wright | J. R. Rotem | 3:58 |
| 7. | "Another Round" | Hoagland; Muhammad; Sheldon Ellerby; C. Lighty; Darrale Jones | Ellerby; Muhammad | 3:21 |
| 8. | "Her" | Gist; Terrence Abney; Ray Angry; Ezekiel Lewis; Laues; C. Lighty; Muhammad; Brailsford | KayGee; Trampbaby; Angry | 3:28 |
| 9. | "II Pink Lines" | Hoagland; Muhammad; Ellerby; Walker; Toby Davis; C. Lighty | Jaheim; Muhammad; Ellerby; C. Lighty | 3:20 |
| 10. | "Otha Half" | Hoagland; D. Lighty; Wesley Hodges; C. Lighty | Jaheim; D. Lighty; Hodges | 4:08 |
| 11. | "Closer" | Hoagland; Michael Warren; Brandon White; Muhammad; C. Lighty | Eric Hudson; Warren; White | 3:48 |
| 12. | "In My Hands" | Hoagland; M. Brailsford; E. Laues; B Muhammad | KayGee; Poyser; Abney | 4:44 |
| 13. | "Ain't Leavin Without You (Remix)" (featuring Jadakiss) | Gist; Laues; Brailsford; Muhammad; Carter; Brookhouse; Drummond; Glenn; Thorp; Volpeliere; Jason Phillips | KayGee | 3:48 |
| Total length: | | | | 49:04 |

Japanese edition bonus tracks
| No. | Title | Length |
|---|---|---|
| 14. | "BMW" | 3:29 |
| Total length: | | 52:36 |

Deluxe edition bonus tracks
| No. | Title | Length |
|---|---|---|
| 14. | "My Swagger" | 4:02 |
| 15. | "Refund" | 3:19 |

iTunes deluxe edition bonus tracks
| No. | Title | Length |
|---|---|---|
| 14. | "In the Dark" | 3:16 |
| 15. | "BMW" | 3:29 |
| 16. | "30 Minute Interview" (Video) | 30:00 |
| 17. | "I Wonder" | 3:19 |

Sample credits

- "Ain't Leavin Without You" contains elements of "Help Is On the Way" as performed by The Whatnauts.
- "Impossible" contains a sample of "When a Man Loves a Woman" as performed by Percy Sledge.
- "Ain't Leavin Without You (Remix)" contains elements of "Help Is On the Way" as performed by The Whatnauts and "Name and Number" as performed by Curiosity Killed the Cat.

== Charts ==
=== Weekly charts ===
| Chart (2010) | Peak position |
|---|---|
| US Billboard 200 | 3 |
| US Top R&B/Hip-Hop Albums (Billboard) | 2 |

=== Year-end charts ===
| Chart (2010) | Position |
|---|---|
| US Billboard 200 | 86 |
| US Top R&B/Hip-Hop Albums (Billboard) | 24 |
