= Whoknows =

Single by Musiq

from the album Soulstar
- Released: January 12, 2004
- Recorded: 2003
- Genre: R&B
- Length: 4:55
- Label: Def Soul
- Songwriters: Taalib Johnson, Ivan Barias, Carvin Haggins, Frank Romano

Musiq singles chronology
"Forthenight" (2003)	"Whoknows" (2004)	"B.U.D.D.Y." (2007)

"Whoknows" is the second and last single from Musiq Soulchild's third album, Soulstar. It was released as an airplay-only single in January, 2004. Former En Vogue singer Dawn Robinson is credited with contributing background vocals.

It debuted on the Billboard Hot R&B/Hip-Hop Songs chart on January 31, 2004, spent 24 weeks on the chart (its last being July 10, 2004) and peaked at No. 23.

"Whoknows" entered the Billboard Hot 100 on April 24, 2004, spending 13 weeks there, peaking at No. 65 and falling off on July 10, 2004.
