= Halfcrazy =

Single by Musiq

from the album Juslisen
- B-side: "Caughtup"
- Released: January 29, 2002
- Recorded: 2001
- Genre: R&B
- Length: 4:14
- Label: Def Soul
- Songwriters: Carvin Haggins; Ivan Barias; Francis Lai; Taalib Johnson
- Producers: Carvin Haggins; Ivan Barias

Musiq singles chronology
"Girl Next Door" (2001)	"Halfcrazy" (2002)	"Dontchange" (2002)

Music video
- "Halfcrazy" on YouTube

"Halfcrazy" is a song performed by Musiq Soulchild (then credited as Musiq), issued as the lead single from his second studio album Juslisen. The single was released only on vinyl; and it contains a sample of Charlie Byrd's cover of Francis Lai's "Vivre Pour Vivre." The song is Musiq's biggest hit to date on the Billboard Hot 100, peaking at No. 16 in 2002.

== Music video ==
Two official music videos were created for "Halfcrazy". The first version, released in April 2002, was directed by Chris Robinson. The second version, released in July 2002, was directed by Jessy Terrero.

== Background ==
According to the song's producers Carvin & Ivan, the song was originally offered to Dru Hill member Larry "Jazz" Anthony who was set to record a solo album for Def Jam Recordings. He initially refused on recording the song for his solo debut, rejecting the sample of Charlie Byrd's "Vivre Pour Vivre" in favor of wanting it played with live instruments. Anthony then dropped the song from his album and "Halfcrazy" was later rewritten with new verses by Musiq for his album Juslisen.

== Chart positions ==
=== Weekly charts ===
Chart (2002)	Peak position
US Billboard Hot 100	16
US Hot R&B/Hip-Hop Songs (Billboard)	2
US Rhythmic Airplay (Billboard)	30

=== Year-end charts ===
Chart (2002)	Position
US Billboard Hot 100	48
US Hot R&B/Hip-Hop Songs (Billboard)	3
