= Love (Musiq Soulchild song) =

2000 song by Musiq Soulchild

Single by Musiq Soulchild

from the album Aijuswanaseing
- Released: December 25, 2000
- Recorded: May 2000
- Genre: R&B, soul
- Length: 4:57
- Label: Def Soul, Def Jam
- Songwriters: Taalib Johnson, Andre Harris, Carvin Haggins
- Producer: Dre & Vidal

Musiq Soulchild singles chronology
| "Just Friends (Sunny)" (2000) | "Love" (2000) | "Girl Next Door" (2001) |

"Love" is the second single from Musiq Soulchild's debut album Aijuswanaseing.

== Background ==
Kenny Lattimore revealed in 2021 that "Love" was originally intended for him and his 1998 album From the Soul of Man. However, by the time the song was presented, the album was already completed and Lattimore could not envision himself singing it. He ultimately passed on the track, partly because Musiq Soulchild's style was so distinct and unconventional that Lattimore couldn’t quite see how his own voice would fit the song.

== Chart performance ==
It debuted on the Billboard Hot R&B/Hip-Hop Songs chart on December 30, 2000, spent 38 weeks on the chart (its last being September 15, 2001), and peaked at #2. "Love" also entered the Billboard Hot 100 on February 17, 2001, spending 22 weeks there, peaking at #24 and falling off on July 7, 2001.

== Music video ==
The music video features shots of the since closed Lorraine Hotel in Philadelphia.

== Cover versions ==
The gospel R&B trio Trin-i-tee 5:7 covered this song in 2002 for their album The Kiss, changing the title to "Lord", making it a gospel song.

== Charts ==
Chart performance for "Love"
| Chart (2000) | Peak position |
|---|---|
| US Billboard Hot 100 | 24 |
| US Hot R&B/Hip-Hop Songs (Billboard) | 2 |
