= Juslisen =

- Original album cover (Note: The cover artwork for Juslisen is shown in light violet; an alternate album art is shown in red and yellow.)

Studio album by Musiq
- Released: May 7, 2002
- Recorded: 2001–2002
- Studio: Larry Gold Studio, A Touch of Jazz Studios, Axis Studios (Philadelphia, Pennsylvania); The Blue Room (New Jersey)
- Genre: R&B; neo soul
- Length: 76:21
- Label: Def Soul; Mama's Boys
- Producer: Ivan "Orthodox" Barias; Carvin "Ransum" Haggins; A. Jermaine Mobley; Hakim Young; Donahue Baker; Vikter Duplaix; James Poyser; 88-Keys; Andre Harris; Vidal Davis; Keith Pelzer; Darren Henson

Musiq chronology
Aijuswanaseing (2000)	Juslisen (2002)	Soulstar (2003)

Singles from Juslisen
- 1. "Halfcrazy" Released: January 29, 2002; 2. "Dontchange" Released: October 29, 2002

Professional ratings
Review scores
Source	Rating
AllMusic	4.5/5 stars
Entertainment Weekly	B+
Los Angeles Times	2.5/4 stars
NME	6/10
People	(favorable)
The Press	3/4 stars
Rolling Stone	4/5 stars
Yahoo! Music	(favorable)

Juslisen (pronounced Just Listen) is the second studio album by American singer Musiq Soulchild, simply known at the time as Musiq. It was released on May 7, 2002, under the Def Soul subsidiary of Def Jam Recordings. Selling 260,150 copies in its first week, it debuted at number one on the Billboard 200, where it spent 35 weeks before falling off on February 22, 2003. It was nominated for Best R&B Album at the 2003 Grammy Awards.

== Track listing ==
Juslisen track listing
No.	Title	Writer(s)	Producer(s)	Length
1.	"Scratch Introlude"	Kyle Jones	Scratch	0:31
2.	"Newness"	Taalib Johnson; Ivan Barias; Carvin Haggins	Ivan "Orthodox" Barias; Carvin "Ransum" Haggins	3:47
3.	"Caughtup" (featuring AAries)	Taalib Johnson; Hamilton Bohannon; Ivan Barias; Carvin Haggins	Ivan "Orthodox" Barias; Carvin "Ransum" Haggins	3:27
4.	"Stoplayin'"	Taalib Johnson; Carvin Haggins; Andre Harris	Ivan "Orthodox" Barias; Carvin "Ransum" Haggins	4:03
5.	"Religious"	Carvin Haggins; Darren Henson; Keith Pelzer; Taalib Johnson; Joseph Modeliste; Art Neville; Leo Nocentelli; George Porter	Darren Henson; Keith Pelzer	4:18
6.	"Babygirl"	Taalib Johnson; Charles Najpa	88-Keys	3:34
7.	"Halfcrazy"	Taalib Johnson; Ivan Barias; Carvin Haggins; Francis Lai	Ivan "Orthodox" Barias; Carvin "Ransum" Haggins	4:14
8.	"Time"	Taalib Johnson; Ivan Barias; Carvin Haggins; Frank Romano	Ivan "Orthodox" Barias; Carvin "Ransum" Haggins	5:16
9.	"Future"	Taalib Johnson; Junius Bervine	Junius Bervine	4:00
10.	"Intermission: Juslisen"	Taalib Johnson; Charles Najpa; Sylvester Stewart	88-Keys	2:07
11.	"Realove"	Taalib Johnson; James Poyser	James Poyser	4:27
12.	"Onenight"	Taalib Johnson; Carvin Haggins	Andre Harris; Vidal Davis	4:41
13.	"Previouscats"	A. Jermaine Mobley; Eric Roberson	A. Jermaine Mobley; Hakim Young; Donahue Baker	4:00
14.	"Solong"	Taalib Johnson; Ivan Barias; Carvin Haggins; Valvin Roane	Ivan "Orthodox" Barias; Carvin "Ransum" Haggins	4:14
15.	"Bestfriend" (featuring Carol Riddick)	Taalib Johnson; Ivan Barias; Carvin Haggins	Ivan "Orthodox" Barias; Carvin "Ransum" Haggins	4:23
16.	"Dontchange"	Taalib Johnson; Ivan Barias; Carvin Haggins; Frank Romano	Ivan "Orthodox" Barias; Carvin "Ransum" Haggins	5:08
17.	"Motherfather"	Taalib Johnson; Vikter Duplaix; James Poyser	James Poyser; Vikter Duplaix	4:31
18.	"Something"	George Harrison	Ivan "Orthodox" Barias; Carvin "Ransum" Haggins	5:08
19.	"Ifiwouldaknew" (Girlnextdoor remix)	Taalib Johnson; Mark DeBarge; Ed Green; Carvin Haggins; Andre Harris; Etterlene Jordan; Jill Scott	Ivan "Orthodox" Barias; Carvin "Ransum" Haggins	4:32

== Samples ==
- "caughtup" contains a sample of "Save Their Souls", as performed by Hamilton Bohannon
- "religious" contains a sample of "Thinking", as performed by the Meters
- "halfcrazy" contains a sample of "Live for Life", as performed by Charlie Byrd
- "intermission: juslisen" contains a sample of "Thank You (Falettinme Be Mice Elf Agin)", as performed by Sly & the Family Stone
- "ifiwouldaknew (girlnextdoor remix)" contains a sample of "Stay with Me", as performed by DeBarge

== Personnel ==
- AAries: featured artist, primary artist, backing vocals
- Ayinke: backing vocals
- Donahue Baker: producer
- Ivan "Orthodox" Barias: producer, arranger, composer, executive producer
- Pablo Batista: percussion
- Anthony Bell: engineer, producer
- Junius Bervine: composer, multi instruments
- Jim Bottari: engineer, tracking
- Parris Bowens: keyboards
- Randy Bowland: guitar
- Jeff Bradshaw: trombone
- Matt Cappy: flugelhorn
- Troy Corbin: backing vocals
- Vidal Davis: engineer, multi instruments, producer
- Timothy Day: engineer
- Mark DeBarge: composer
- Vikter Duplaix: composer, guest artist, producer, programming
- Chris Gehringer: mastering
- Serban Ghenea: mixing
- Larry Gold: string arrangements
- Akisia Grigsby: art direction
- Carvin "Ransum" Haggins: composer, executive producer
- Andre Harris: composer, engineer, keyboards, multi instruments, producer
- George Harrison: composer
- Wendell Haskins: fashion stylist
- Darren "Limitless" Henson: composer, producer
- Ayana Hipps: vocals
- Jerome Hipps: executive producer
- Derrick Hodge: bass
- Jamar Jones: clavinet, Fender Rhodes, keyboards, organ, Wurlitzer
- Kyle "Scratch" Jones: beatboxing
- Etterlene Jordan: composer
- Francis Lai: composer
- Anthony Mandler: photographer
- Carlos "Storm" Martinez: engineer, tracking
- Michael McArthur: executive producer
- A. Jermaine Mobley: composer, guitar
- Musiq (Soulchild): primary artist, producer
- Jethaniel Nixon: bass
- Keith Pelzer: composer, producer
- James Poyser: composer, keyboards, percussion, producer
- Carol Riddick: guest artist, primary artist, vocals
- Eric Roberson: composer, tracking, vocal producer, backing vocals
- Francesco Romano: arranger, composer, guitar
- Jill Scott: composer
- Jon Smeltz: engineer
- Sylvester Stewart: composer
- Eric Tribett: drums
- Dave Wilson: barber
- Hakim Young: producer

== Charts ==
=== Weekly charts ===
Weekly chart performance for Juslisen
Chart (2002)	Peak position
Canadian Albums (Nielsen SoundScan)	52
Canadian R&B Albums (Nielsen SoundScan)	10
UK Albums (OCC)	97
UK R&B Albums (OCC)	18
US Billboard 200	1
US Top R&B/Hip-Hop Albums (Billboard)	1

=== Year-end charts ===
Year-end chart performance for Juslisen
Chart (2002)	Position
Canadian R&B Albums (Nielsen SoundScan)	106
US Billboard 200	67
US Top R&B/Hip-Hop Albums (Billboard)	11

== Certifications ==
Certifications for Juslisen
Region	Certification	Certified units/sales
United States (RIAA)	Platinum	1,000,000^{^}
^{^} Shipments figures based on certification alone.

== See also ==
- List of Billboard 200 number-one albums of 2002
- List of number-one R&B albums of 2002 (U.S.)
