= Dontchange =

Single by Musiq

from the album Juslisen
- Released: October 29, 2002
- Recorded: 2001
- Genre: R&B
- Length: 5:08
- Label: Def Soul
- Songwriters: Taalib Johnson, Ivan Barias, Carvin Haggins, Frank Romano

Musiq singles chronology
"Halfcrazy" (2002)	"Dontchange" (2002)	"Nothing at All" (2003)

"Dontchange" is the second and last single from Musiq Soulchild's second album Juslisen. It was released on October 29, 2002, as a 12" single, after being serviced to radios in July 2002.

It debuted on the Billboard Hot R&B/Hip-Hop Songs chart on August 10, 2002, spending 42 weeks on the chart and reaching a peak position at number 3. On the Billboard Hot 100, it debuted on September 7, 2002, spending 26 weeks there and peaking at #17. The song hit # 1 on the Adult R&B chart and stayed there for 9 weeks from November 9, 2002 to February 8, 2003.

== Charts ==
=== Weekly charts ===
Chart (2002–03)	Peak position
US Billboard Hot 100	17
US Adult R&B Songs (Billboard)	1
US Hot R&B/Hip-Hop Songs (Billboard)	3
US Dance Club Songs (Billboard); Pound Boys Remixes	31

=== Year-end charts ===
Chart (2002)	Position
US Hot R&B/Hip-Hop Songs (Billboard)	44
Chart (2003)	Position
US Hot R&B/Hip-Hop Songs (Billboard)	30
