= Musiq Soulchild =

American singer and songwriter (born 1977)

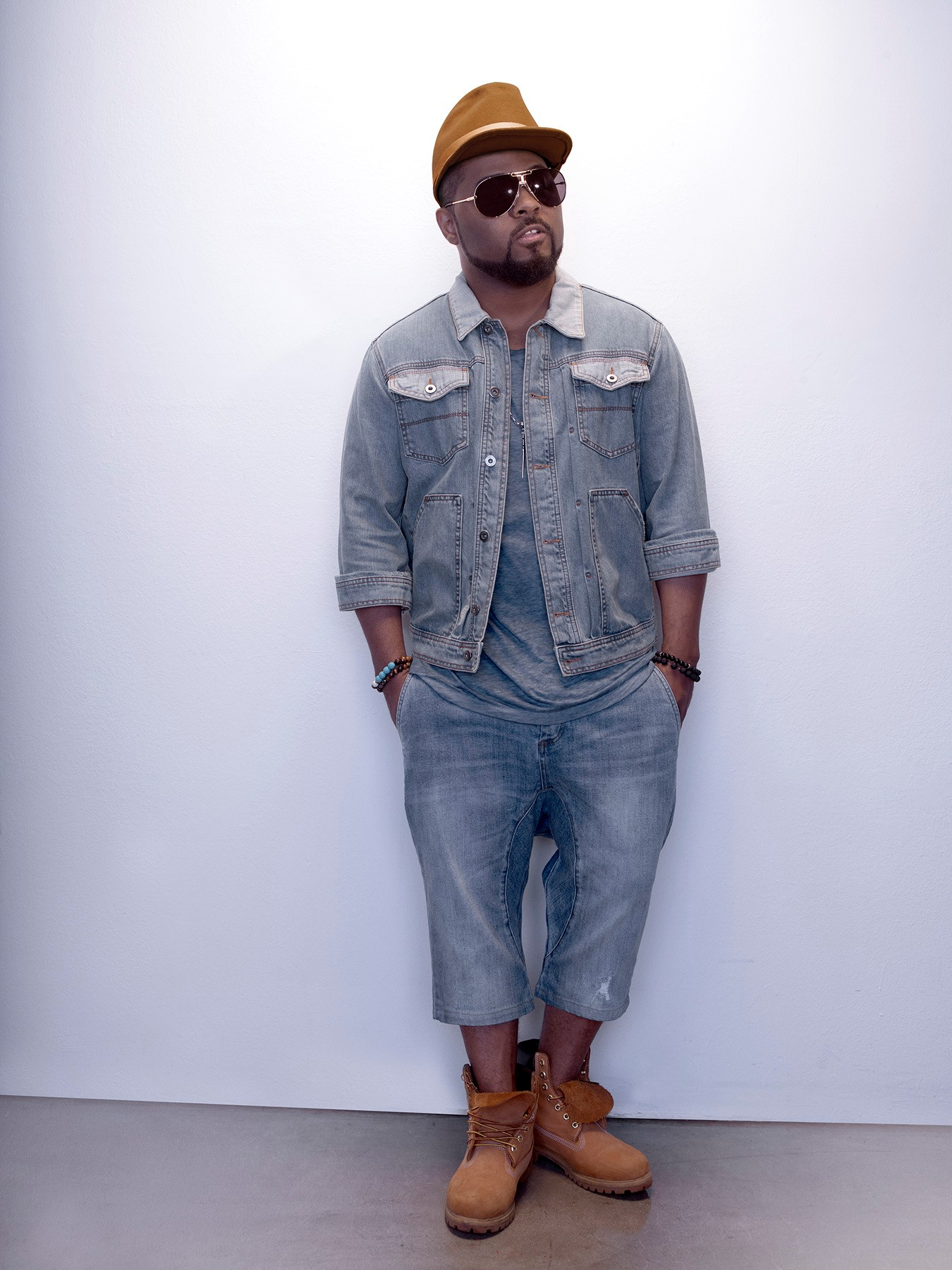
- Musiq Soulchild in 2016

Background information
- Also known as: The Husel; Purple Wondaluv
- Born: Taalib Hassan Johnson; September 16, 1977 (age 49); Philadelphia, Pennsylvania, U.S.
- Genres: R&B; neo soul
- Occupations: Singer; songwriter; record producer
- Instrument: Vocals
- Years active: 1998–present
- Labels: Def Soul; Def Jam; Atlantic; My Block; Soulstar Music Company; E1
- Website: musiqsoulchild.com

Taalib Hassan Johnson (born September 16, 1977), better known by his stage name Musiq Soulchild (or simply Musiq; pronounced "music") is an American singer-songwriter. His music blends R&B, funk, blues, jazz, and gospel influences fused with hip hop.

He signed with Def Soul to release his debut studio album, Aijuswanaseing (2000). It moderately entered the Billboard 200, while his second album, Juslisen (2002), peaked atop the chart and spawned the single "Halfcrazy", his highest entry—at number 16—on the Billboard Hot 100. He released third album, Soulstar (2003), before parting ways with the label in favor of Atlantic Records. The label released his fourth album, Luvanmusiq (2007), which peaked atop the Billboard 200 once more.

== Early life ==
Musiq was born in Philadelphia, Pennsylvania, and raised in a strict Muslim household. During his teenage years he built a reputation for being musically gifted, beat boxing for MCs freestyling on the open mic circuit, scatting at jazz clubs, or just performing an a cappella for strangers on the streets, which is where he got the name "Musiq" and later added "Soulchild." He cites as his inspirations such icons as Marvin Gaye, Stevie Wonder, and Donny Hathaway. He dropped out of high school to pursue a career in music.

"There were people who knew of me but they didn't really know me; they just knew me as 'that music dude.' So after getting that so much, I was like, 'Just call me Musiq.' It was so fresh to me because if I had to be called anything, I would have wanted to be called Music. That's how much I dug it; when you see me, I want you to automatically think of music. The stage name "Musiq Soulchild" is technically two ideas. 'Musiq' is the front man and 'Soulchild' is the idea behind it. It's basically me as an artist in this generation, representing the traditions and the legacies of the past soul stars."

== Career ==
=== 1998–2004: Def Soul ===
In 1998, Musiq Soulchild signed with Def Soul Records, the contemporary R&B division of Universal Music's Def Jam Recordings. He later released his debut album, Aijuswanaseing, in late 2000. Its lead single was "Just Friends (Sunny)". His second single "Love" spent 22 weeks on the Billboard Hot 100 charts.

Musiq's second album, 2002's Juslisen, debuted at number one on both the Billboard 200 and R&B/Hip-Hop Albums, reaching platinum-sales status. The singles were "Halfcrazy" and "Dontchange", which were top ten hits.

In 2003, Musiq released his third album, Soulstar, which went gold. It included the singles "Forthenight" and "Whoknows".

Musiq took a four-year break and changed his management to Solqi Management. In 2006, media outlets circulated that Musiq was involved in a de facto record label trade, transitioning from Def Soul's master label Def Jam Recordings to Atlantic Records, and sending rapper Fabolous from Atlantic to Def Jam.

=== 2006–2012: Atlantic Records ===
In March 2007, Musiq's released his fourth album Luvanmusiq. Its singles were "B.U.D.D.Y.", an uptempo track, "Teachme", and "Makeyouhappy."

His fifth album OnMyRadio was released on December 2, 2008. The lead single "Radio" was a complete contrast to the usual smooth neo soul Musiq fans were accustomed to. The following singles were the duet "IfULeave" featuring Mary J. Blige, and the ballad "SoBeautiful". The latter marked the first collaboration between Musiq and producer JR Hutson, after Hutson had spent "about eight months" trying to get Musiq to come by his studio. According to Hutson, the two planned to work together again.

In May 2010, he changed management to Victor Grieg.

His last album for Atlantic MusiqInTheMagiq was released on May 3, 2011, available on CDs and also as a digital download. The first single was "Anything" featuring Swizz Beatz, followed by "Yes".

=== 2013–present My Block Records, Soulstar Music Company, eOne Records ===
In September 2013, Musiq released a duet album with Syleena Johnson, titled 9ine. This album was a compilation of nine reggae songs recorded in nine days on the independent Shanachie label.

Also in September 2013, Musiq announced his departure from Atlantic Records and becoming an independent artist. He revealed he is now signed to record producer Warryn Campbell's label My Block Records. Musiq previously worked with Campbell on his first two albums on Atlantic – 2007's Luvanmusiq and 2008's OnMyRadio.

He released an EP titled The Husel through DatPiff on July 30, 2014.

In April 2016, he released his first independent solo album through My Block/E1 Music, Life on Earth. The lead single is "I Do". Shortly after, he moved to a new label, with eOne/SoulStar Music Company.

In 2017, he released two new singles "Simple Things" and "Start Over" set for a new album titled Feel the Real due on September 15, 2017. He premiered music videos for the tracks in April 2017.

=== Other music ===
Musiq Soulchild has featured on

- the song "Beautiful Contradiction" on British soul singer Beverley Knight's 2002 studio album Who I Am.
- the song "Nothing at All" from Carlos Santana's October 2002 album Shaman;
- The Roots's November 2002 Phrenology on the song "Break You Off";
- rapper Skillz's December 2002 I Ain't Mad No More on the song "Wave Ya Hands!";
- "Are You Experienced?" in March 2004's Power of Soul: A Tribute to Jimi Hendrix album;
- Black Ice's September 2006 The Death of Willie Lynch on the song "Takeyatime";
- rapper Lloyd Banks's October 2006 album Rotten Apple on the song "Addicted";
- "Reasons" on the March 2007 tribute album Interpretations: Celebrating the Music of Earth, Wind & Fire;
- on Talib Kweli's August 2007 album Eardrum on the song "Oh My Stars";
- Ice Cube's August 2008 album Raw Footage on the song "Why Me?";
- Rapsody's November 2017 album Laila's Wisdom on the song "A Rollercoaster Jam Called Love";
- Kehlani's February 2019 mixtape While We Wait on the song "Footsteps";
- Smif-N-Wessun's March 2019 album The All on the song "Ocean Drive".

==== Soundtrack songs ====
Soulchild has also appeared on the soundtrack to Tyler Perry's February 2007 movie Daddy's Little Girls.

He also lent a song from his March 2007 album Luvanmusiq to the soundtrack for Perry's later movie Why Did I Get Married?, released October 2007.

He then recorded a remake of Arrested Development's song "People Everyday" with British rapper and singer Estelle for the soundtrack to Tyler Perry's March 2008 Meet the Browns titled "People Everyday (Metamorphosis Mix)".

== Television and books ==
Musiq guest starred as himself in the UPN sitcom Half and Half in May 2004 and The CW comedy The Game in October 2007.

On June 25, 2012, Musiq released a book on love and relationships, titled 143 – Love According To Musiq.

== Personal life ==
When Musiq was a young child, he developed a lazy eye from an accident that occurred while being fed by his uncle.

In 2009, he had a son with 702 singer Kameelah Williams. He also has a daughter named Satori, born in 2017, with Ashley "Tiyumba" Wright. Musiq resides in Atlanta, Georgia.

== Discography ==
=== Studio albums ===
List of studio albums, with selected details, chart positions and certifications
Title	Details	Peak chart positions				Certifications (sales threshold)
Title	Details	US	US R&B/HH	US R&B	US Ind.	Certifications (sales threshold)
Aijuswanaseing	Released: November 14, 2000; Label: Def Soul, Def Jam; Formats: CD, LP, cassette, digital download	24	4	—	—	RIAA: Platinum
Juslisen	Released: May 7, 2002; Label: Def Soul, Def Jam; Formats: CD, LP, cassette, digital download	1	1	—	—	RIAA: Platinum
Soulstar	Released: December 9, 2003; Label: Def Soul, Def Jam; Formats: CD, LP, cassette, digital download	13	3	—	—	RIAA: Gold
Luvanmusiq	Released: March 13, 2007; Label: Atlantic; Formats: CD, LP, digital download	1	1	—	—	RIAA: Gold
OnMyRadio	Released: December 9, 2008; Label: Atlantic; Formats: CD, digital download	11	1	—	—	
MusiqInTheMagiq	Released: May 3, 2011; Label: Atlantic; Formats: CD, digital download	8	3	—	—	
Husel Music (as The Husel)	Released: May 5, 2015; Label: Soulstar Music Company; Formats: Digital download	—	—	—	—	
Life on Earth	Released: April 15, 2016; Label: My Block, E1 Music; Formats: CD, digital download	27	3	2	5	
Feel the Real	Released: September 15, 2017; Label: eOne, SoulStar Music Company; Formats: CD, digital download	126	—	16	11	

=== Collaboration albums ===
List of collaboration albums, with selected details and chart positions
Title	Details	Peak chart positions
Title	Details	US R&B/HH
9ine (with Syleena Johnson)	Released: September 24, 2013; Label: Shanachie; Formats: CD, download	54
Victims and Villains (with Hit-Boy)	Released: March 10, 2023; Label: SoulStar Music Company; Formats: Download	—

=== EPs ===
List of EPs, with selected details and chart positions
Title	Details	Peak chart positions		
Title	Details	US	US R&B/HH	US Holiday
A Philly Soul Christmas / Christmas Musiq	Released: 2008 (physical) October 30, 2009 (digital); Label: Atlantic; Formats: CD, download	88	20	9
The Pre-Up – EP	Released: July 30, 2014; Label: Soulstar Music Company; Formats: Download	—	—	—
The EternaL Peace EP	Released: June 18, 2015; Label: Soulstar Music Company; Formats: Download	—	—	—

=== Singles ===
List of singles, with selected chart positions
Title	Year	Peak chart positions		Album
Title	Year	US	US R&B/HH	Album
"Just Friends (Sunny)"	2000	31	6	Aijuswanaseing
"Love"	2000	24	2	Aijuswanaseing
"Girl Next Door" (featuring Ayana)	2001	85	28	Aijuswanaseing
"Halfcrazy"	2002	16	2	Juslisen
"Dontchange"	2002	17	3	Juslisen
"Forthenight"	2003	53	18	Soulstar
"Whoknows"	2004	65	23	Soulstar
"B.U.D.D.Y."	2007	36	2	Luvanmusiq
"Teachme"	2007	42	2	Luvanmusiq
"Makeyouhappy"	2007	—	61	Luvanmusiq
"Radio"	2008	—	55	OnMyRadio
"IfULeave" (featuring Mary J. Blige)	2008	71	6	OnMyRadio
"SoBeautiful"	2009	84	8	OnMyRadio
"Silky Soul"	2010	—	—	Silky Soul Music – An All-Star Tribute to Maze & Frankie Beverly
"Anything" (featuring Swizz Beatz)	2011	—	31	MusiqInTheMagiq
"Yes"	2011	—	24	MusiqInTheMagiq
"Feel the Fire" (with Syleena Johnson)	2013	—	—	9ine
"I Do"	2016	—	11	Life on Earth
"Simple Things"	2017	—	—	Feel the Real
"Start Over"	2017	—	11	Feel the Real

==== As featured artist ====
List of singles as featured artist, with selected chart positions
Title	Year	Peak chart positions			Album
Title	Year	US	US R&B	UK	Album
"Break You Off" (The Roots featuring Musiq Soulchild)	2002	99	55	59	Phrenology
"Nothing at All" (Santana featuring Musiq Soulchild)	2003	—	—	—	Shaman
"Takeyatime" (Black Ice featuring Musiq Soulchild)	2006	—	—	—	The Death of Willie Lynch
"Why Me" (Ice Cube featuring Musiq Soulchild)	2008	—	—	—	Raw Footage
"Chocolate High" (India.Arie featuring Musiq Soulchild)	2008	114	19	—	Testimony: Vol. 2, Love & Politics
"Forever" (The Floacist featuring Musiq Soulchild)	2010	—	—	—	Floetic Soul
"Hope for Haiti" (Kim Burrell featuring Musiq Soulchild, Michelle Williams, Lil' Mo and Tye Tribbett)	2010	—	—	—	Charity single
"Ah Yeah" (Robert Glasper Experiment featuring Chrisette Michele and Musiq Soulchild)	2012	—	86	—	Black Radio
"Still Believe in Love" (Demetria McKinney featuring Musiq Soulchild)	2013	—	—	—	Non-album singles
"Give It to You" (Meelah featuring Musiq Soulchild)	2015	—	—	—	Non-album singles
"Footsteps" (Kehlani featuring Musiq Soulchild)	2019	—	—	—	While We Wait
"Your Turn" (Ty Dolla Sign featuring Musiq Soulchild, Tish Hyman and 6lack)	2020	—	—	—	Featuring Ty Dolla Sign

== Accolades ==
Soulchild has two platinum as well as two gold albums altogether.

He has also received awards from BET and the ASCAP among others.

Soulchild has also received 13 Grammy nominations, including three for his 2007 album Luvanmusiq.

=== ASCAP Awards ===
Year	Nominee / work	Award	Result
2002 ASCAP Awards	Musiq Soulchild	Best Male R&B Artist	Won

=== BET Awards ===
Year	Nominee / work	Award	Result
2001	Musiq Soulchild	Best Male R&B Artist	Won
2001	Musiq Soulchild	Best New Artist	Nominated
2003	Musiq Soulchild	Best Male R&B Artist	Nominated
2007	Musiq Soulchild	BET Centric Award	Nominated
2009	Musiq Soulchild	BET J Award	Nominated

=== American Music Awards ===
Year	Nominee / work	Award	Result
2002	Musiq Soulchild	Favorite Soul/R&B New Artist	Nominated

=== Grammy Awards ===
Year	Nominee / work	Award	Result
2002	"Love"	Best Male R&B Vocal Performance	Nominated
2003	"Halfcrazy"	Best Male R&B Vocal Performance	Nominated
2003	Juslisen	Best R&B Album	Nominated
2004	"Forthenight"	Best Urban/Alternative Performance	Nominated
2005	"Are You Experienced?"	Best Urban/Alternative Performance	Nominated
2008	"B.U.D.D.Y."	Best Male R&B Vocal Performance	Nominated
2008	Luvanmusiq	Best R&B Album	Nominated
2010	"SoBeautiful"	Best Male R&B Vocal Performance	Nominated
2010	"IfULeave" (feat. Mary J. Blige)	Best R&B Performance by a Duo or Group with Vocals	Nominated
2010	"Chocolate High" (with India.Arie)	Best R&B Performance by a Duo or Group with Vocals	Nominated
2011	"We're Still Friends"	Best Male R&B Vocal Performance	Nominated
2017	"I Do"	Best R&B Performance	Nominated
2018	Feel the Real	Best R&B Album	Nominated
