= Chris Brown's Journey =

Video by Chris Brown
- Released: May 30, 2006
- Genre: R&B
- Label: Jive

Chris Brown's Journey is a DVD containing videos for Brown's first single "Run It!" featuring Juelz Santana, "Yo (Excuse Me Miss)" and "Gimme That (Remix)" featuring Lil Wayne. A CD boasts an international version of "Run It!" and the track "So Glad", which had been previously unreleased in the United States.

Also included on the DVD are dance demos and a half-hour documentary featuring highlights from Brown's promo tours in the United Kingdom and Japan, Grammy Week in Los Angeles and rehearsals for his tour.

== Certifications ==
Region	Certification	Certified units/sales
United States (RIAA)	Gold	50,000^{^}
^{^} Shipments figures based on certification alone.
