= Visit Philadelphia =

Tourism promotion organization

- Visit Philadelphia
- Formation: 1996
- Type: Destination marketing organization (non-profit)
- Purpose: Tourism
- Headquarters: 2005 Market Street #3700, Philadelphia, Pennsylvania 19103
- Location: Philadelphia, Pennsylvania, U.S.
- Region served: Philadelphia, Pennsylvania, U.S.
- President and CEO: Angela Val
- Key people: Ed Rendell, Meryl Levitz, Manny Stamatakis
- Website: www.visitphilly.com

Visit Philadelphia, formally known as the Greater Philadelphia Tourism Marketing Corporation (GPTMC), is a private, non-profit organization that promotes leisure travel to the five-county Philadelphia metropolitan area, including Bucks, Chester, Delaware, Montgomery, and Philadelphia counties in Pennsylvania.

It was founded in 1996 by the City of Philadelphia, the Commonwealth of Pennsylvania, and The Pew Charitable Trusts. In 1998, House Bill 2858, Act 174 designated VISIT PHILADELPHIA, then GPTMC, to serve as the official Regional Attractions Marketing Agency.

== Corporate information ==
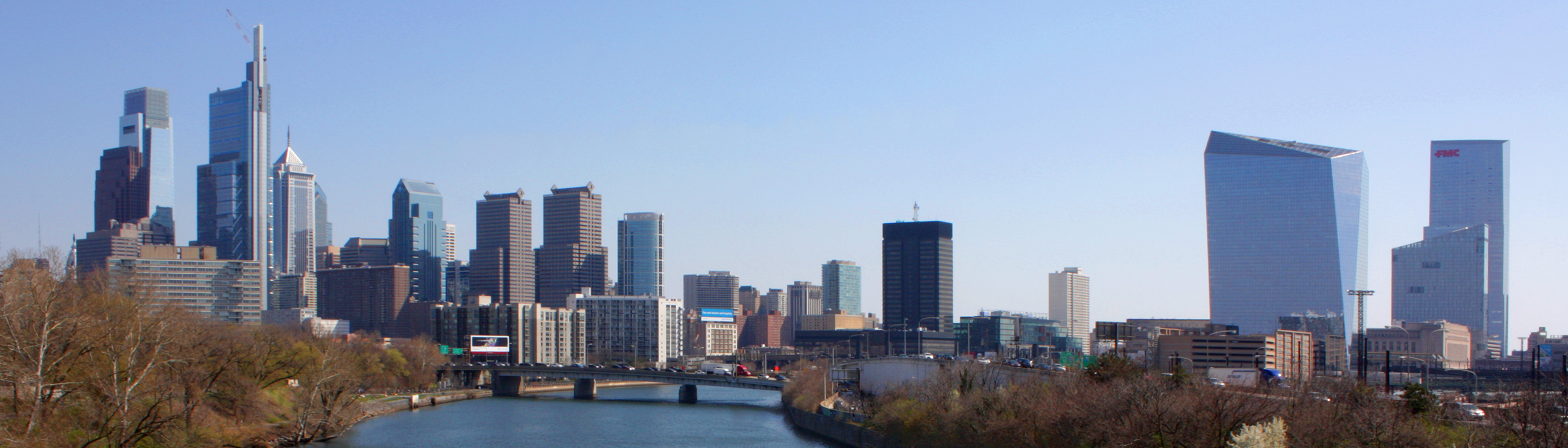
The skyline of Philadelphia, the nation's sixth-largest city

As the region's official tourism marketing agency, Visit Philadelphia works to build the Greater Philadelphia area's image, drive visitation and boost the economy. The organization utilizes robust campaigns, media relations, advertising, websites and social media to market the area and promote tourism. Its goal is to show potential tourists that Philadelphia is a destination to visit.

== History ==
In 1996, then-Philadelphia mayor Edward G. Rendell created the GPTMC in 1996 to attract tourists; the corporation operated separately from the Philadelphia Convention and Visitors Bureau. According to the Encyclopedia of Greater Philadelphia, the newly created agency "took a regional approach to 'Philadelphia and Its Countryside' and formed partnerships with similar organizations in the region: the Valley Forge Convention and Visitors Board, Visit Bucks County, and the Brandywine Conference and Visitors Bureau, among others."

Prior to 2013, Visit Philadelphia was named The Greater Philadelphia Tourism and Marketing Corporation (GPTMC). In 2010, GPTMC launched a new web platform, VisitPhilly.com, and began plans for an official name change. However, it wasn’t until three years later, in 2013, when the change became official. Visit Philadelphia’s website was the most-visited destination website of the 10 largest cities in the U.S. that year.

Several factors were instrumental in facilitating the name change, perhaps most prominently being an effort to utilize a more self-explanatory moniker. A drive toward greater technological optimization also played a part in orchestrating the change. An internal study found that the word “Philadelphia” was searched much more frequently than any other word when internet users inquired about the city. The name change made it much easier for interested travelers to find the organization.

Since its first national ad campaign in 1997, Visit Philly has launched a variety of campaigns and initiatives considered especially innovative for a destination marketing organization. All of these campaigns were implemented with the goal of communicating Philadelphia’s personal essence, voice and image.

=== Philly, the City that Loves You Back ===
Its first national ad campaign took place in 1997. This campaign introduced the slogan "The City that Loves you Back" as both "a reply and a challenge to the 'I Love New York' slogan" and a way to counter the "antisocial reputation" that Philadelphia had developed. Though this was not the first campaign, it marked a change from earlier campaigns that mostly focused on the city’s historical artifacts in Center City, such as Independence Hall and the Liberty Bell. The firm Longwoods International estimated that the “Place That Loves You Back” campaign was responsible for attracting more than 1 million new visitors on overnight and day trips to the region.

In 2009, Visit Philadelphia began a new campaign with the "With Love, Philadelphia XOXO" tagline.

=== Get Your History Straight and Your Nightlife Gay ===
In 2003, the slogan "Get your history straight and your nightlife gay" was created in order to attract more LGBT tourism. The first ads were vintage-inspired flyers with Benjamin Franklin and Betsy Ross, though later ads included the landmark 2004 TV spot “Pen Pals”.

Prior to the campaign, Philadelphia was not on the list of top 20 LGBT destinations. In response, the city became the first destination to run a gay TV commercial, and by 2010, moved up to tie for 9th position of places visited by gay and lesbian travelers, according to Community Marketing, an LGBT market research firm.

Reactions to the campaign were initially mixed, with 300 people responding to the TV ad, two-thirds of which were disapproving. In 2005, State Rep. Daryl D. Metcalfe (R., Butler) sent letters to fellow House members complaining that tax dollars were being used to "promote immoral behaviors." However, this did not catch on with other legislative members. The campaign was honored by the U.S. Travel Association, the Association of National Advertisers, Hospitality Sales and Marketing Association International, the Public Relations Society of America, and PRWeek for its creativity and performance in the marketplace.

=== Philly’s More Fun When You Sleep Over ===
The September 11 attacks in 2001 had a negative impact on overnight stays in cities across the United States. As a way to combat this resistance to travel and curb losses to its $1 billion hospitality industry, Visit Philadelphia (then GPTMC) launched a consumer campaign and hotel package.

“Philly’s More Fun When You Sleep Over,” the resulting campaign, kept things light and depicted tourists dancing around in their pajamas checking out classic spots such as the Museum of Art and Independence Mall. The overnight hotel package focused on potential visitors living within easy driving distance, specifically those along the East Coast in cities such as Baltimore, Harrisburg, and the surrounding Philadelphia counties.

The campaign led to the sale of 36,000 hotel room nights at 44 different hotels between November and March 2002. Research conducted by Smith Travel Research showed that Philadelphia lost less annual revenue from overnight hotel stays than any major Northeast city post September 11. In fact, Philadelphia’s overnight visitation grew 15% from 2000 to 2002. The research also showed a significant improvement in Greater Philadelphia’s image from 1997 to 2002.

=== With Love, Philadelphia XOXO ===
In 2009, Visit Philadelphia began a new campaign coining the tagline "With Love, Philadelphia XOXO. The visual component of the advertising campaign was presented in the form of a mashup of notes from the city itself to potential visitors.

While the campaign rolled out a variety of new efforts for the destination marketing organization, the centerpiece of the campaign was the organization's new website -- visitphilly.com. Prior to the shift, the organization’s website was named “gophila.com.” The campaign also marked a greater push into the social media realm for the organization, including an increased presence on Facebook and Twitter.

Launched in response to the ongoing recession, the “With Love, Philadelphia XOXO” campaign helped recapture a segment of the population that was quickly dwindling, tourists. As many destination marketing organizations struggled to find ways to stimulate demand in the travel industry, Visit Philadelphia re-engaged consumers using this campaign’s strategy, which paired “love letters” from the city with good deals aimed at tourists. Ultimately, the campaign generated over 3.7 million incremental trips in 2010 alone and over $432 million in additional direct spending into the local economy.

The campaign achieved national recognition for its creativity and success. In 2011, the U.S. Travel Association awarded its coveted Destiny Awards honor for best full marketing campaign to the “With Love, Philadelphia XOXO'' campaign. The campaign was also included in Frommer’s round up of their 15 favorite tourism slogans in February 2012.

=== Philly 360 ===
While the destination marketing organization had dabbled in social media campaigns before, Philly 360 was Visit Philadelphia’s first major non-traditional, social media-focused campaign. The goal of the campaign was to promote Philadelphia with a younger African-American perspective. By concentrating on music, nightlife, fashion, the arts, and other similar topics, the Philly 360 campaign hoped to widen its reach to a younger demographic.

Though Visit Philadelphia had been seeking to attract African Americans through its marketing campaigns since the 90s, Philly 360 marked the first time that the organization specifically marketed to the emerging group of urban African American travelers under 40. The campaign, launched in 2009, spoke to an urban Millennial audience looking to explore the country’s metropolitan hubs and driven by a need for diverse creative influence.

Visit Philadelphia rolled out Philly 360 in the hopes that it would achieve the same level of success with the African American community as its “Philadelphia - Get Your History Straight and Your Nightlife Gay” campaign received from the LGBTQ+ community in 2003. The campaign helped to extend the Visit Philadelphia brand, while also rallying the African-American creative community through partnerships with artists such as DJ Jazzy Jeff and The Roots.

=== Filadelfia - You Gotta Feel it ===
“Filadelfia — You Gotta Feel It” was a marketing campaign to attract Latinx visitors over the summer of 2019. The campaign used Spanglish messaging, such as “Pero there’s so much more,” in ads showcasing Philadelphia’s tourist attractions and local restaurants. The campaign was launched with ads on major TV networks like Telemundo and social media posts by Latinx influencers like Sebastián Gómez and Esperanza Hernández of @ twotrends.

The campaign was developed with the help of the Latino Advisory Marketing Committee, and also included a five-part video series featuring Latinx influencers visiting classic Philadelphia spots. In addition to TV ads, Visit Philadelphia also placed ads in public transportation stops, metro stations and highways to encourage travelers to visit the 38th Annual Hispanic Fiesta, the Latin Alternative Music Conference, or Salsa at Spruce. To attract regional visitors looking for an overnight stay, ads were placed in both New York and D.C. public transit stations, including a takeover of New York’s Penn Station.

The campaign targeted Latinx audiences and incorporated Spanish-language messaging and influencer participation. It was informed by data indicating increasing purchasing power within Latinx communities.

“Filadelfia — You Gotta Feel It”, along with “Philadelphia Pioneers on the Road to Stonewall,” won Visit Philadelphia the Outstanding Association Award at The Philadelphia Inquirer’s 2019 Diversity & Inclusion Awards Gala. The campaign also received the Corporate Initiative of the Year award from the Greater Philadelphia Hispanic Chamber of Commerce for showcasing the diversity within the Hispanic community and featuring Hispanic entrepreneurship.

=== Philadelphia Pioneers on the Road to Stonewall ===
To commemorate the 50th anniversary of the Stonewall riots, Visit Philadelphia created the “Philadelphia Pioneers On the Road to Stonewall'' float for the Philadelphia LGBTQ+ Pride Parade and World Pride 2019 in New York. The Road to Stonewall campaign and float were funded in partnership with the Commonwealth of Pennsylvania and dmhFund. Apart from New York City itself, Visit Philadelphia’s LGBTQ+ advertising presence at World Pride 2019 was the largest of any city in the country. The organization participated in its ninth Station Domination at Penn Station, which included a full-motion video projection featuring LGBTQ+ and Stonewall graphics, two women of color in front of Independence Hall, two men holding hands at the Liberty Bell, and a drag performer.

The float itself, designed by artist Todd Marocci, was 34-feet in length. In the front, it featured a gold 7-foot-tall replica of the Liberty Bell and at its back stood a 3D-printed reproduction of the Stonewall Inn. In between the two, a platform connected either end with five chairs in the middle marking each decade that had passed since the riots. Though the Stonewall riots of 1969 are widely considered the most significant moment in the struggle for LGBTQ+ rights, Philadelphia’s Annual Reminders played a significant part in the fight for rights as well. The Annual Reminders, organized by a local gay rights group in 1965, featured yearly pickets outside of the Liberty Bell, which were the first of their kind in the U.S. After the Stonewall riots, protesters moved to the site of the Inn for future demonstrations and the fight continued on.

The float, on show at both the Philadelphia LGBTQ+ Pride Parade and World Pride 2019, pays tribute to both historic movements. The campaign won Visit Philly the Outstanding Association Award at The Philadelphia Inquirer’s 2019 Diversity & Inclusion Awards Gala, alongside PHL Diversity and Prospanica Philadelphia, and received a 2019 HSMAI Gold Adrian Award.

=== City of Sisterly Love ===
In 2020, Philadelphia’s nickname was temporarily changed from “The City of Brotherly Love” to “The City of Sisterly Love” to honor the 100th anniversary of the 19th Amendment. The resolution to change the nickname was introduced by Councilwoman Katherine Gilmore Richardson and co-sponsored by all seven women on the council. The resolution was intended to celebrate the achievements of the women's suffrage movement, while acknowledging that women of color were not fully enfranchised until The Voting Rights Act of 1965.

The nickname change was a joint effort between City Council and Visit Philadelphia as part of its year long initiative to celebrate sisterhood. To advertise the nickname change, Visit Philly put up a billboard in New York’s Times Square welcoming people to the City of Sisterly Love.

== Awards ==
Title of the Award	Title of Entry	Category	Win
HSMAI: The 2004 Adrian Awards	Betsy Ross Sews Gay Rainbow Flag (Advertising)	Advertising: Individual Room/Travel Sales	Gold
HSMAI: The 2004 Adrian Awards	Jon Stewart Discovers Gay-Friendly Philadelphia	Public Relations: Feature Placement Broadcast/Radio	Gold
HSMAI: The 2004 Adrian Awards	Philly - Get Your History Straight & Your Nightlife Gay	Public Relations: Marketing Program- Consumer	Platinum
HSMAI: The 2004 Adrian Awards	Philly - Get Your History Straight & Your Nightlife Gay	Advertising Award (TV): Individual Room	Platinum
HSMAI: The 2004 Adrian Awards	Philadelphia Tourism News Connects	Public Relations: Newsletter	Gold
HSMAI: The 2004 Adrian Awards	Liberty in Motion	Public Relations: Publicity Photo with Caption	Gold
HSMAI: The 2004 Adrian Awards	Pet Friendly Philadelphia	Public Relations: Press Kit/Media Kit	Silver
The Chamber of Commerce for Greater Philadelphia’s Excellence Awards	GPTMC	Nonprofit Organization of the Year	Winner
PRWEEK Awards 2005	Philadelphia, Get Your History Straight and Your Nightlife Gay	Public Relations: Multi-Cultural Marketing	Winner
PRWEEK Awards 2005	Non-Profit Team of the Year	Public Relations: Non-for-Profit PR Team	Honorable Mention
Pepperpot Awards	Liberty In Motion	Special Events and Observances (seven days or fewer)	Silver Ladle
HSMAI: The 2005 Adrian Awards	Salvador Dali	Public Relations: Public Relations Campaign	Gold
HSMAI: The 2005 Adrian Awards	Ben Franklin 300 Philadelphia	Public Relations: Press Kit	Silver
HSMAI: The 2005 Adrian Awards	Cooking Light article	Public Relations: Best public relations feature	Silver
HSMAI: The 2005 Adrian Awards	“These and Theses”	Advertising: Best ad series for television spots	Bronze
HSMAI: The 2005 Adrian Awards	Salvador Dali	Advertising: Best campaign	Bronze
HSMAI: The 2005 Adrian Awards	Fourth of July, 2005	Public Relations: Best special event	Bronze
2006 TIA Odyssey Awards	Philadelphia – Get Your History Straight and Your Nightlife Gay award	Domestic SeeAmerica Marketing Award	Platinum
PR News Award	“Philadelphia: The Next Great Vintage Shopping Destination"	Press Release	Honorable Mention
HSMAI: The 2006 Adrian Awards	Gophila.com/pressroom	On-Line Press Room	Gold
HSMAI: The 2006 Adrian Awards	Tourism 2006: A Report to the Industry	Single Item Entry Press Kit/Media Kit	Silver
2006 PRSA Pepperpot Award	Philly’s Got Benergy	Public Relations: Special Events	Pepperpot (Highest Honor)
2006 PRSA Pepperpot Award	Tourism 2006: A Report to the Industry	Public Relations: Single piece communication	Ladle
2007 PRSA Bronze Anvil	Uwishunu	Blog	Bronze
2007 PRSA Bronze Anvil	SoundAbout Philly	Podcast	Award of Commendation
The Communicator Awards	Tourism 2006: A Report to the Industry	Non-Profit Report	Honorable Mention
2007 PR News’ Platinum PR Award	SoundAboutPhilly™ Podcast Tours	Podcast and/or Videocast category	Platinum
HSMAI: The 2007 Adrian Awards	Philadelphia – The Place to B.Y.O.Be	Marketing Program-Consumer	Gold
HSMAI: The 2007 Adrian Awards	uwishunu.com	Web Marketing Blog	Silver
HSMAI: The 2007 Adrian Awards	SoundAboutPhilly™ Podcast Tours	Web Marketing Podcast Series	Silver
HSMAI: The 2007 Adrian Awards	BlogPhiladelphia Tourism 2.0	Web Marketing Social Media	Silver
HSMAI: The 2007 Adrian Awards	Uwishunu in USA Today	Featured Placement Print Consumer Newspaper	Bronze
HSMAI: The 2007 Adrian Awards	King Tut Goes Golden in Philadelphia	Re-launch of Existing Product	Bronze
HSMAI: The 2007 Adrian Awards	Philadelphia R Family Vacations Weekend	Special event	Bronze
2008 PRSA Bronze Anvil	Vodcast Series: Illadates	Vodcasts	Bronze
2008 PRSA Bronze Anvil	BlogPhiladelphia	Blogger campaign	Award of Commendation
2008 PR News NonProfit PR award	Uwishunu	Blog	Winner: Crystal Award
2008 PR News NonProfit PR award	Ben & Betsy Wedding	Event Public Relations	Honorable Mention
HSMAI: The 2009 Adrian Awards	Ben & Betsy Wedding	Special event	Platinum
HSMAI: The 2009 Adrian Awards	Philly Beer Week	Consumer Marketing Program	Bronze
HSMAI: The 2008 Adrian Awards	The City of Brotherly Love Also Loves the Arts	Feature Placement Print- Consumer Newspaper	Silver
HSMAI: The 2009 Adrian Awards	GPTMC – Feel the Love in Philadelphia: Winter 2009 Love Campaign	Relaunch of existing product	Silver
HSMAI: The 2009 Adrian Awards	Gophila.com/pressroom: A 24/7 Media Resource	Media Center – Online Press Room	Silver
2009 Bronze Anvil	Gophila.com/pressroom: A 24/7 Media Resource	Web Sites: Online Media Room	Award of Commendation
2010 Davey Award	Philly Homegrown™ Press Kit	N/a	Silver
2010 PRSA Silver Anvil Awards	Philly 360	Multicultural Public Relations	Silver
2010 PR News Platinum PR Awards	Official Philly Brag Book	External Publication	Honorable Mention
2010 PR News Platinum PR Awards	It’s Always Sunny in Philadelphia Itinerary	Press Release	Honorable Mention
2010 PR News NonProfit PR Awards	With Love, Philadelphia XOXO	Social Media Campaign	Winner
HSMAI: The 2010 Adrian Awards	With Love, Philadelphia XOXO	Marketing Program – Consumer	Gold
HSMAI: The 2010 Adrian Awards	With Love, Philadelphia XOXO®	Marketing Program – Consumer	Platinum
Philadelphia Business Journal Social Media Star	With Love Letter for Cliff Lee	N/A	Social Media Star
Pennsylvania Association of Broadcasters’ 2011 Awards for Excellence in Broadcasting Competition	Black History Month Vignettes	N/A	Outstanding Television Public Service Announcement
PRSA 2011 Bronze Anvil	Tourism 2010 Report to the Region: Worth the Trip	Annual Reports, Nonprofit Organizations	Award of Commendation
HSMAI: The 2011 Adrian Awards	The President’s House: Freedom and Slavery in the Making of a New Nation	Public Relations, New Opening/Launch	Gold
2011 U.S. Travel Destiny Award	With Love, Philadelphia XOXO	Marketing Program – Full Campaign	Winner
2012 Travel + Leisure SMITTY (Social Media in Travel + Tourism Awards)	Eat, Drink & Go Foodspotting in Philly	Best Use of a Social Media Platform	Winner
HSMAI: The 2012 Adrian Award	With Art Philadelphia in US Airways Magazine	In-flight Consumer	Silver
2013 Travel + Leisure SMITTY (Social Media in Travel + Tourism Awards)	Philadelphia’s All A-Twitter	Best Twitter Feed	Winner
PR Daily’s 2013 Social Media Awards	Philadelphia Neighborhoods Guest Instagrammer Program	Best Use of Instagram	Honorable Mention
PR Daily’s 2013 Social Media Awards	Philadelphia’s All A-Twitter	Best Use of Twitter	Honorable Mention
2014 PRSA Silver Anvil Award	Philadelphia Neighborhoods Campaign	Marketing Consumer Services, Travel and Tourism/Hospitality	Award of Excellence
HSMAI: The 2014 Adrian Awards	Ben Franklin’s Facebook Page on Time.com	Feature Placement Online-Consumer Media	Gold
HSMAI: The 2014 Adrian Awards	Instagram Press Trip to Philadelphia	Social Media/Social Networking	Gold
HSMAI: The 2014 Adrian Awards	Visit Philly Beer Garden Series	Public Relations Campaign: Special Event	Silver
2015 PR News Platinum PR Awards	New Americans Tour	Multicultural Campaign	Honorable Mention
HSMAI: The 2015 Adrian Awards	Surprise and Delight	Social Media Social Networking	Gold
Shorty Awards	LinkedIn Proves Importance of Destination Marketing for Philadelphia	Best Use of an Emerging Platform	Finalist
2016 PRSA Bronze Anvil	VISIT PHILADELPHIA 2015 Annual Report	Annual Reports	Award of Commendation
2016 Destinations Council Destiny Awards (ESTO)	With Love, Philadelphia XOXO (ADVERTISING ENTRY)	Category 2: Budget $1–5 million	Destiny Award
HSMAI: The 2016 Adrian Awards	Visitphilly.com/dncpress	Media Center – Online Press Room	Silver
2016 PR News Digital PR Awards	Visit Philly Snapchat	Snapchat Communications	Winner
2016 PR News PR People Awards	Cara Schneider	Media Relations Professional Of The Year	Honorable Mention
2016 PRSA Pepperpot Awards	How VISIT PHILADELPHIA Generated Historic Destination Coverage During The DNC	Media Relations – Not For Profit	Pepperpot (highest honor)
2016 City Nation Place Awards	The Evolution of Real-Time Engagement	Best Use of Social Media	Finalist
Billy Penn’s 2017 Who’s Next: Communications	Jenea Robinson	N/A	Honoree
Billy Penn’s 2017 Who’s Next: Tourism	Dana Schmidt	N/A	Honoree
HSMAI: The 2017 Adrian Awards	DNC Geo-targeting	Location-Based Demographically Targeted Campaign	Gold
HSMAI: The 2017 Adrian Awards	Visit Philly Overnight Hotel Package Winter Getaway	Influencer Marketing Campaign	Gold
HSMAI: The 2017 Adrian Awards	Visit Philly Overnight Hotel Package Winter Getaway	Integrated Marketing Campaign for Consumers	Bronze
PR Daily’s 2017 Nonprofit PR Awards	Reporting VISIT PHILADELPHIA’s 2016 Success In A Revolutionary Report	Annual Report	Honorable Mention
PR Daily’s 2017 Nonprofit PR Awards	How VISIT PHILADELPHIA Inspires and Repurposes User-Generated Content	User-Generated Content	Winner
PR Daily’s 2017 Nonprofit PR Awards	VISIT PHILADELPHIA’s Historic District Campaign	Nonprofit PR Campaign of the Year	Honorable Mention
Philly Ad Club Addy Awards 2018	We Got You: Philly by Tarik	Film, Video & Sound - Webisode – Series	Winner
Cynopsis Short Form Video Awards 2018	We Got You: Philly by Tarik	Series Travel	1st Place
Destinations International	Amber Burns	30 Under 30	Honoree
2018 City Nation Place	Instagram Exchange	Best Use of Social Media	Finalist
eTSY Award (eTourism Summit)	Eagles Surprise and Delight	Best Executed Strategy	Winner
2018 PRSA Pepperpot Awards	Instagram Exchange	Social media	Ladle
2018 PRSA Pepperpot Awards	We Got You: Philly	Multicultural marketing	Pepperpot
Travel and Tourism Research Association (TTRA) Conference	Lauren Hansen-Flaschen	Yesawich Award for Marketing Excellence	Winner
HSMAI: The 2018 Adrian Awards	Behind the Eats: Philadelphia	Multimedia Series	Bronze
HSMAI: The 2018 Adrian Awards	From Viewer To Doer: Facebook Videos Inspiring Travel (Flavors of Philly series)	Facebook Mobile Video	Silver
HSMAI: The 2018 Adrian Awards	We Got You: Inspiring Black Travelers To Visit Philly	Multicultural Marketing	Silver
HSMAI: The 2018 Adrian Awards	VISIT PHILADELPHIA Online Media Center	Online Press Room	Silver
HSMAI: The 2018 Adrian Awards	Redesigned & Reimagined Visitphilly.com	Website	Gold
HSMAI: The 2018 Adrian Awards	Retargeting Marketing	Geotargeted Campaign	Gold
Hermes Creative Awards 2019	Philly Heaven in a Box	Social Media: Consumer Engagement	Platinum
Hermes Creative Awards 2019	2019 Instagram Calendar	Marketing Collateral Branding: Calendar	Gold
Hermes Creative Awards 2019	American Way Advertorial	Writing: Advertorial	Gold
PR Daily’s Video & Visual Awards 2018	Flavors of Philly	Low-budget Video	Winner
AIVA Communicator Awards	Visitphilly.com	Website Redesign (General); Travel / Tourism Website; Website Visual Appeal & Aesthetic	Award of Excellence
Destiny Awards	Combating a Shutdown	Special Projects	Winner
Destiny Awards	Retarget Marketing Campaign: Year 1	Branding and Integrated Marketing Campaign: Destination Marketing Budget More Than $10 Million	Winner
PR Daily’s Media Relations Awards	Ringing the Bell for Tourism: Visit Philadelphia’s response during the Government Shutdown, Visit Philadelphia	Crisis or Reputation Management Campaign	Winner
The Philadelphia Inquirer’s Diversity & Inclusion Awards	Visit Philadelphia	Outstanding Association Award	Winner
HSMAI: The 2019 Adrian Awards	Combating A Shutdown	Community Service/Social Responsibility	Silver
HSMAI: The 2019 Adrian Awards	Philadelphia Pioneers On The Road To Stonewall	LGBT	Gold
PR Daily’s Video & Visual Awards 2019	As Philadelphian as Cheesesteaks and Gritty	Influencer Video	Winner
Global Traveler’s Leisure Lifestyle Awards	Philadelphia/General	Best Domestic Historical Attractions	Winner

== Controversies and disputes ==
=== Embezzlement scandal ===
Joyce Levitt, who worked for Visit Philadelphia from 2003 to 2012 and served as CFO for seven years, embezzled $210,000 from the organization between September 2005 and the discovery of the fraud in 2012. Visit Philadelphia did not report the misconduct to authorities, instead allowing Levitt to quietly resign and pay full restitution. In 2014, following media reports, the Philadelphia District Attorney conducted a grand jury investigation leading to the prosecution of Levitt. In May 2016, in a plea agreement with prosecutors, Levitt pleaded guilty to theft, receiving stolen property, and fraud, and was sentenced to three years' probation and community service; she also forfeited her accounting license.

=== Consolidation attempt ===
In 2014, the Philadelphia City Controller's office issued a report urging the consolidation of Visit Philadelphia and the Philadelphia Convention and Visitors Bureau. The report found that the agencies had occasionally clashed, had competing slogans, and did not adequately coordinate efforts, and concluded that merging the two agencies could save $1 million in administrative costs annually. The report found that from 1993 to 2013, "the annual number of overnight leisure travelers to Philadelphia increased by 84 percent" and Visit Philadelphia was credited for about two-thirds of that increase. The report contrasted this to business travel (the responsibility of PHLCVB), which was "essentially flat since 1997." The report, found, however, that PHLCVB had a better return on investment ("$74 for each tax dollar spent as opposed to $69 per tax dollar spent by Visit Philadelphia") because business travelers tend to spend more than tourists.
