= Curt Chambers =

American singer-songwriter

- Origin: Philadelphia, Pennsylvania U.S.
- Genres: Country, Hip hop, R&B, Rock, Pop
- Occupations: Vocalist, songwriter producing, performer
- Instruments: Guitar, lap steel guitar, pedal steel guitar, bass, drums, keyboards, synthesizers, organ
- Years active: 2005–present

Curt Chambers is a Grammy-nominated singer-songwriter, producer, and guitarist from Philadelphia who has gained notoriety for his blending of rock, soul, country music and hip hop. As a guitar player he has played and toured the world with T-Pain, Alicia Keys, Eminem, Dr. Dre, Jerry Douglas, Travis Barker, Rihanna, Mac Miller, Tyler Rich, Jay-Z, Eric Roberson and others.

== Career ==
While living in Los Angeles, Chambers spent time writing, playing shows, and touring with many established artists. Chambers splits his time between Nashville, Tennessee and Los Angeles, California where he continues to write and produce music. In 2010 Chambers was nominated for a Grammy Award in the category for Best R&B song for his work on Finding My Way Back. He's represented by William Morris Endeavor (WME) talent agency following the independent release of his single "Man Like Me." He has been invited to perform in different capacities at the CMA Music Festival, Musicians Hall of Fame and Museum, Exit/In, Whiskey Jam, and Boots on Stage Shindig at Sea. He has also taken the stage in various venues in Southern California like The Hotel Cafe, The Ranch Saloon, Stagecoach Festival, and Coachella. As a country artist Chambers has toured with artists such as Tyler Rich and Dustin Lynch, Florida Georgia Line, Chris Young, and Jake Owen. In September 2018 Chambers made his television debut as a Country Music Artist as a guest performer on Nick Cannon's Wild 'n Out. November 2019 Chambers premiered his single and music video, Roll With It on Billboard Magazine.

== Discography ==
- 85 South 2021, EP digital download
- Man Like Me 2018, Single digital download
- Pops 90's Country Weekend Mixtape 2019, EP digital download
- Up in the Air 2019, Single digital download
- Don't Rock The Jukebox, 2019 Single digital download
- Roll With It, 2019 Single digital download
