= List of awards and nominations received by Ledisi =

Ledisi awards and nominations
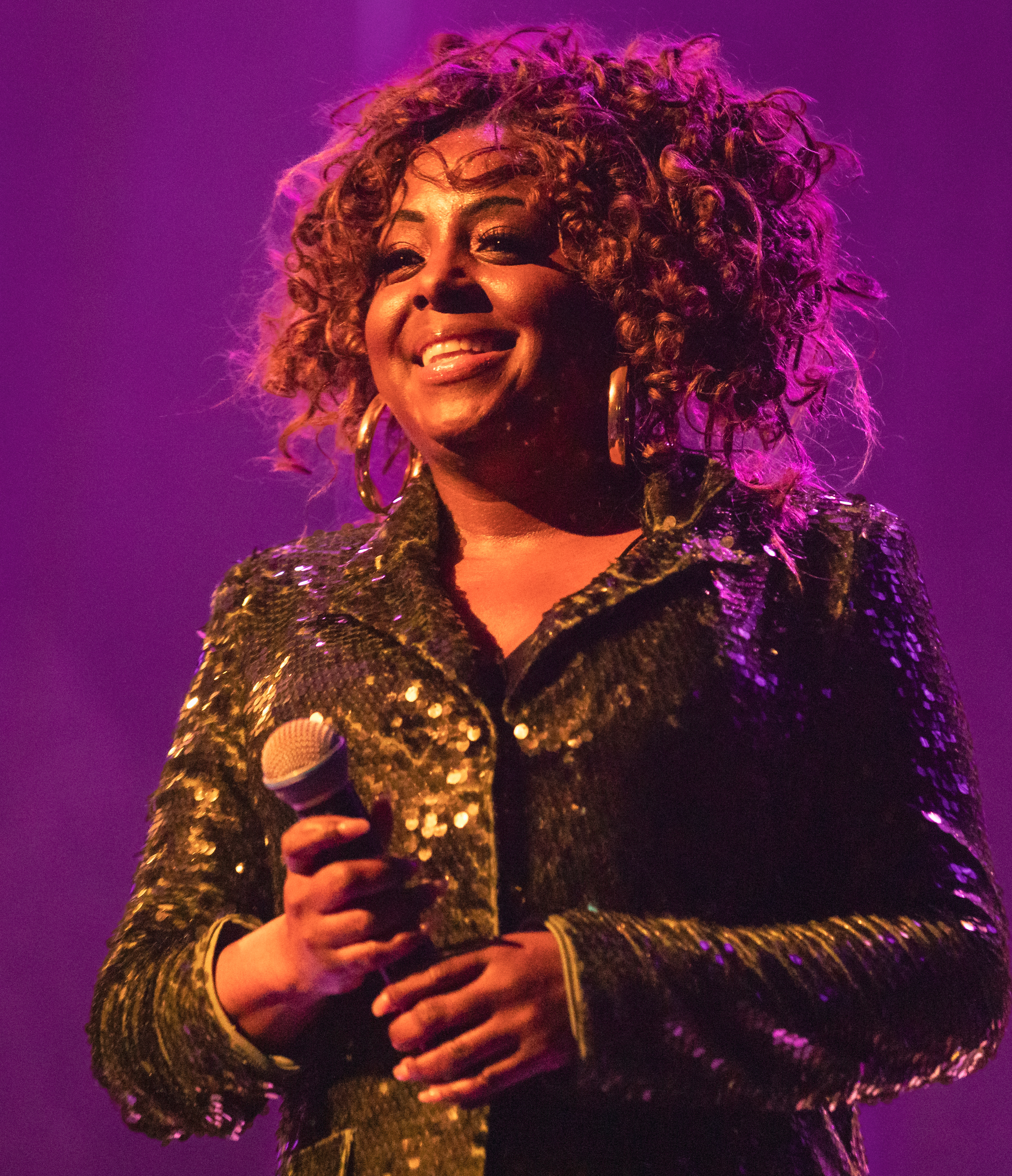
- Ledisi in 2024
Awards and nominations
Award	Wins	Nominations
Grammy	1	13

Totals (Note: Certain award groups do not simply award one winner. They acknowledge several different recipients, have runners-up, and have third place. Since this is a specific recognition and is different from losing an award, runner-up mentions are considered wins in this award tally. For simplification and to avoid errors, each award in this list has been presumed to have had a prior nomination.)
- Wins: 5
- Nominations: 47

Ledisi is an American singer-songwriter and actress. She began her career as the lead character Dorothy Gale in an Antioch Community Theater production of The Wiz in Antioch, California. Her performance earned a Shellie Award nomination for Best Actress in the same year. After forming her first independent record label LeSun Music, she released two albums Soulsinger (2000) and Feeling Orange but Sometimes Blue (2002), the latter of which won "Outstanding Jazz Album" at the California Music Awards in 2003.

She secured two nominations at the 50th Annual Grammy Awards in 2008, including Best New Artist. Her albums Lost & Found (2007), Turn Me Loose (2009), Pieces of Me (2011), and Let Love Rule (2017) have all garnered Grammy Award nominations for Best R&B Album. In 2020, Ledisi released a single "Anything for You", which won a Grammy Award for Best Traditional R&B Performance at 63rd Annual Grammy Awards. She received a nomination for Outstanding Breakthrough Performance in a Motion Picture at the 54th NAACP Image Awards in 2023.

As of 2026, Ledisi has accumulated a total of five competitive award wins and forty-seven nominations. She has also received a total of five honorary awards.

== Music ==
=== BET Awards ===
Award	Year	Category	Work	Result	Ref.
BET Awards	2008	Cool Like Dat Award	—	Nominated	
BET Awards	2008	Virtual Awards Female Artist of the Year	—	Nominated	
BET Awards	2018	Dr. Bobby Jones Best Gospel/Inspirational Award	"If You Don't Mind"	Nominated	

=== California Music Awards ===
Award	Year	Category	Work	Result	Ref.
California Music Awards	2003	Outstanding Jazz Album	Feeling Orange but Sometimes Blue	Won	
California Music Awards	2003	Outstanding R&B Album	Feeling Orange but Sometimes Blue	Nominated	
California Music Awards	2003	Outstanding Female Vocalist	—	Nominated	

=== Grammy Awards ===
Award	Year	Category	Work	Result	Ref.
Grammy Awards	2008	Best New Artist	—	Nominated	
Grammy Awards	2008	Best R&B Album	Lost & Found	Nominated	
Grammy Awards	2010	Best R&B Album	Turn Me Loose	Nominated	
Grammy Awards	2010	Best Female R&B Vocal Performance	"Goin' Thru Changes"	Nominated	
Grammy Awards	2012	Best R&B Performance	"Pieces of Me"	Nominated	
Grammy Awards	2012	Best R&B Song	"Pieces of Me"	Nominated	
Grammy Awards	2012	Best R&B Album	Pieces of Me	Nominated	
Grammy Awards	2013	Best R&B Performance	"Gonna Be Alright (F.T.B.)" (with Robert Glasper)	Nominated	
Grammy Awards	2015	Best R&B Performance	"Like This"	Nominated	
Grammy Awards	2018	Best R&B Performance	"High"	Nominated	
Grammy Awards	2018	Best Traditional R&B Performance	"All the Way"	Nominated	
Grammy Awards	2018	Best R&B Album	Let Love Rule	Nominated	
Grammy Awards	2021	Best Traditional R&B Performance	"Anything for You"	Won	
Grammy Awards	2022	Best Traditional Pop Vocal Album	Ledisi Sings Nina	Nominated	
Grammy Awards	2026	Best R&B Album	The Crown	Nominated	
Grammy Awards	2026	Best Traditional R&B Performance	"Love You Too"	Nominated	
Grammy Awards	2027	Best Jazz Vocal Album	For Dinah	Nominated	

=== NAACP Image Awards ===
Award	Year	Category	Work	Result	Ref.
NAACP Image Awards	2012	Best Female Artist	—	Nominated	
NAACP Image Awards	2014	Best Female Artist	—	Nominated	
NAACP Image Awards	2015	Best Female Artist	—	Nominated	
NAACP Image Awards	2018	Best Female Artist	—	Nominated	
NAACP Image Awards	2018	Outstanding Song	"High"	Nominated	
NAACP Image Awards	2018	Outstanding Music Video	"High"	Nominated	
NAACP Image Awards	2021	Best Female Artist	—	Nominated	
NAACP Image Awards	2021	Outstanding Album	The Wild Card	Nominated	
NAACP Image Awards	2021	Outstanding Soul/R&B Song	"Anything for You"	Nominated	
NAACP Image Awards	2021	Outstanding Music Video	"Anything for You"	Nominated	
NAACP Image Awards	2021	Outstanding Duo, Group, or Collaboration	"Anything for You" (featuring PJ Morton)	Nominated	
NAACP Image Awards	2022	Outstanding Jazz Album	Ledisi Sings Nina	Nominated	
NAACP Image Awards	2026	Outstanding Jazz Album	For Dinah	Nominated	

=== Soul Train Music Awards ===
Award	Year	Category	Work	Result	Ref.
Soul Train Music Awards	2009	Best R&B/Soul Female Artist	—	Nominated	
Soul Train Music Awards	2011	Centric Award	—	Nominated	
Soul Train Music Awards	2014	Best R&B/Soul Female Artist	—	Nominated	
Soul Train Music Awards	2017	Best R&B/Soul Female Artist	—	Nominated	
Soul Train Music Awards	2017	Soul Train Certified Award	—	Won	
Soul Train Music Awards	2018	Soul Train Certified Award	—	Won	
Soul Train Music Awards	2020	Soul Train Certified Award	—	Nominated	

== Acting ==
=== Albuquerque Film & Music Experience ===
Award	Year	Category	Work	Result	Ref.
Albuquerque Film & Music Experience	2022	Best Actress	Remember Me: The Mahalia Jackson Story	Nominated	

=== Charlotte Black Film Festival ===
Award	Year	Category	Work	Result	Ref.
Charlotte Black Film Festival	2022	Best Actress	Remember Me: The Mahalia Jackson Story	Nominated	

=== Lavazza IncluCity Festival ===
Award	Year	Category	Work	Result	Ref.
Lavazza IncluCity Festival	2022	Best Actress	Remember Me: The Mahalia Jackson Story	Nominated	

=== Las Vegas Black Film Festival ===
Award	Year	Category	Work	Result	Ref.
Las Vegas Black Film Festival	2022	Best Actress	Remember Me: The Mahalia Jackson Story	Won	

=== NAACP Image Awards ===
Award	Year	Category	Work	Result	Ref.
NAACP Image Awards	2023	Outstanding Breakthrough Performance in a Motion Picture	Remember Me: The Mahalia Jackson Story	Nominated	

=== Ovation Awards ===
Award	Year	Category	Work	Result	Ref.
Ovation Awards	2019	Featured Actress in a Musical	Witness Uganda	Nominated	

=== Shellie Awards ===
Award	Year	Category	Work	Result	Ref.
Shellie Awards	1990	Best Actress	The Wiz	Nominated	

== Other accolades ==
Award	Year	Category	Ref.
NAACP Theatre Awards	2016	Spirit Award	
Americans for the Arts	2016	Music Honoree	
Black AIDS Institute	2018	Honoree	
EmpowHer	2020	Music Honoree	
Los Angeles Jazz Society	2022	Jazz Vocalist Honoree	
