= Ledisi: The Legend of Little Girl Blue =

2019 concert residency by Ledisi

- Residency by Ledisi
- Location: Beverly Hills, California, U.S.
- Venue: Wallis Annenberg Center for the Performing Arts
- Associated album: Ledisi Sings Nina
- Start date: December 13, 2019
- End date: December 29, 2019
- No. of shows: 19

Ledisi: The Legend of Little Girl Blue was the first concert residency by American singer Ledisi. It was held for nineteen shows in December 2019. The residency was held at the Wallis Annenberg Center for the Performing Arts in Beverly Hills, California. Ledisi performed a set list consisting of her songs as well as songs written or performed by Nina Simone, backed by her own band to an audience of 500. The concept of the shows revolves around the impact Ledisi's mother Nyra Young and American singer Nina Simone had on Ledisi's life and career. The show also featured a tribute to other influential figures, including Philandro Castile, Marilyn Monroe, Julia Roberts, and Michael Jackson.

Ledisi: The Legend of Little Girl Blue received mixed responses from music critics who praised Ledisi's vocals but also criticized the show for its "lack of narrative". The show sold out nineteen performances. The success of Ledisi: The Legend of Little Girl Blue has led Wallis Annenberg Center to ask Ledisi to return for another future production and in March 2024, the venue became the opening date of her The Good Life Tour.

== Background ==
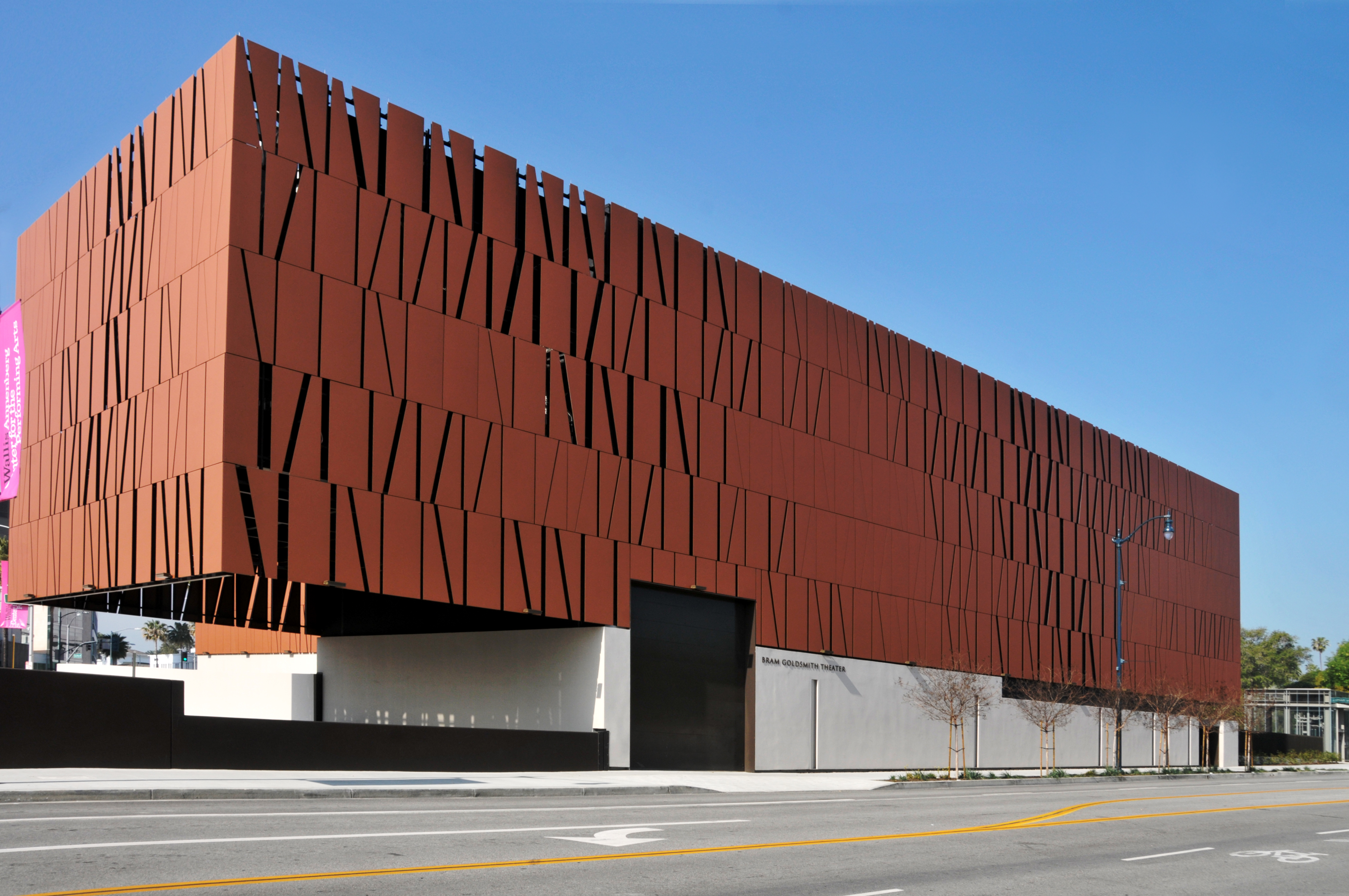
The concerts were held in Beverly Hills' Wallis Annenberg Center for the Performing Arts to a sold-out audience.

On August 15, 2019, Ledisi's announced that she would be performing a residency show at Wallis Annenberg Center for the Performing Arts in Beverly Hills, California from December 13 to December 22, 2019. Tickets for the shows were available on August 15 on The Wallis. When the tickets went on sale to the general public on August 15, 2019, for the residency's first week, the dates sold out. As a result, eight additional performances were added to the residency due to the original dates being sold out months in advance. The residency eventually extended to December 29 and played to nineteen sold-out shows.

In an online interview with BroadwayWorld, Ledisi spoke in depth about the upcoming shows and impact of Nina Simone stating "Nina Simone's legacy lifted me and reminded me to be proud of my skin and embrace the walk I was given. Her music lets me know I am not alone in my journey." In a separate interview, she further stated "The way she expressed the words like a conversation is a master class in storytelling. Her phrasing cuts through even when it's soft and the notes were an afterthought. The feeling always won me." The Wallis' Artistic Director Paul Crewes stated he "appreciated the opportunity to work with Ledisi, who brings her exceptional artistry to our stage."

== Development ==
I met Billy Porter while I was an understudy on Broadway for Caroline, or Change and workshopping The Color Purple. Billy and I became friends while singing with the Broadway Inspirational Voices. I have always been a fan of how he blended different genres of music in his shows. So, together we bonded over music. He was directing Once on This Island in Los Angeles and asked me to play Asaka. That is where I met producer Suzi Dietz. When I decided to do this show in a semi-theatrical way, my first call was asking Billy to be involved, and Suzi showed up right behind him. I am so grateful they are here guiding my team and I through this.

—Ledisi BroadwayWorld interview

Ledisi: The Legend of Little Girl Blue was written by Ledisi and Daniel Beaty. It was directed by Gregg Field and produced by Billy Porter and Suzi Dietz. Kim Burse served as the music supervisor and Brandon Waddles as the musical director. The concept of the shows revolves around Ledisi's life and the connections she has with her mother Nyra Dynese Young as well as Nina Simone. Ledisi orchestrated a tribute concert tour to Simone titled Nina and Me Tour in mid-2019 and included some of the same songs that Simone wrote or recorded into the residency show. Ledisi also included her own original songs in the show.

== Concert synopsis ==
The show begins with Ledisi coming onstage dressed as Nina Simone in a high headdress and African robe. Her band plays the lead-in to the blues song "My Baby Just Cares for Me". In character as Simone, Ledisi comments that the band is playing too loudly and that they might as well continue on playing. She eventually performs the song. After performing several of Simone's songs, Ledisi performs Simone's cover version of "Trouble in Mind" while detailing how Simone's version of the song helped Ledisi overcome suicidal depression.

Following a costume change, Ledisi portrays her mother Nyra, exclaiming to the audience "Nina Simone was one of my greatest sheros, making it possible for singers like me to believe our dreams could come true. But my first shero was my mother". She then launches into a story about witnessing her mother's beating.

Ledisi eventually portrays herself in the remainder of the show. She performs her song "Alright" while recalling her mother who inspired her to continue her music career which eventually led to writing the song "Alright" as well as Ledisi jokingly telling the audience how her mother wants "15% of everything".

== Critical response ==
The show received mixed reviews. Stephen Fife of Stage Raw criticized the show and stated that it "lacks a gripping narrative".

== Set list ==
1. "My Baby Just Cares for Me"
2. "Feeling Good"
3. "Trouble in Mind"
4. "Be My Husband"
5. "Little Girl Blue"
6. "Four Women"
7. "Alright"
8. "I Put a Spell on You"

== Personnel ==
Band

- Musical Director/Piano: Brandon Waddles
- Bass: David Parks
- Drums: Brian Collier
- Guitar: Nomad
- Percussionist: Ronnie Gutiérrez
- Background vocalists: Shannon Pearson, Keisha Renee, Sara Williams
