= Nina and Me Tour =

2019 concert tour by Ledisi

Nina and Me Tour / Ledisi Sings Nina Tour
- Tour by Ledisi
- Promotional poster for the tour
- Location: North America; Europe
- Associated album: Ledisi Sings Nina
- Start date: May 10, 2019
- End date: September 15, 2023
- Legs: 2
- No. of shows: 21

Ledisi concert chronology
- Ledisi Live UK Tour (2019); Nina and Me Tour (2019) Ledisi Sings Nina Tour (2021–2023); The Wild Card Tour (2021)

The Nina and Me Tour was the seventh concert tour by American singer Ledisi. After the release of Ledisi's tenth album Ledisi Sings Nina (2021), the tour was revived as the Ledisi Sings Nina Tour in July 2021. The Ledisi Sings Nina Tour also coincided with The Wild Card Tour (2021). A concert special, Ledisi Live: A Tribute to Nina Simone, aired on PBS on November 28, 2020, featuring the performance recorded at Myron's Jazz Cabaret in the Smith Center for the Performing Arts in Las Vegas, Nevada on February 1, 2020.

== Background ==
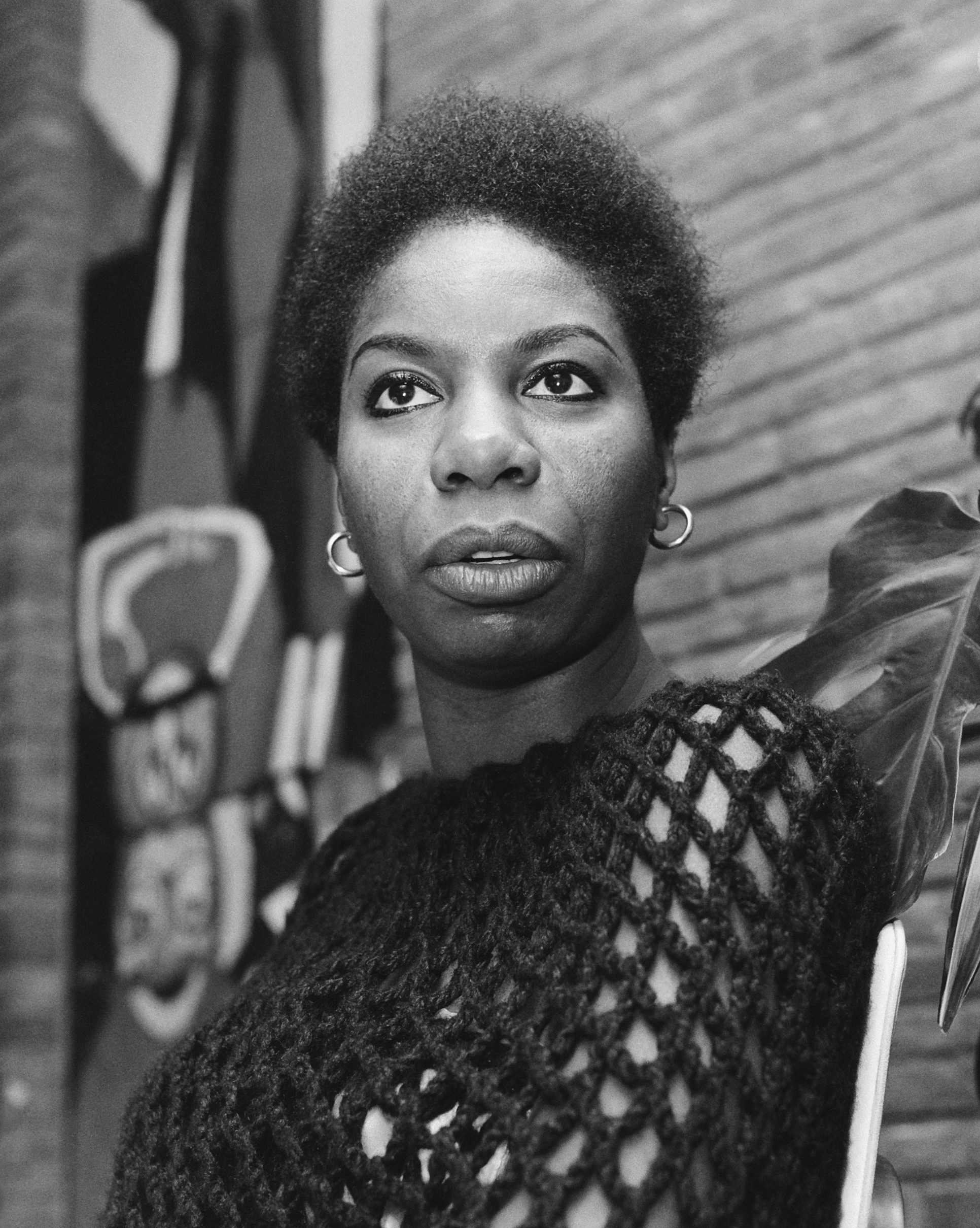
Nina Simone served as an inspiration for the title of the tour.

In 2003, Ledisi recounted first listening to Nina Simone. After the release of her second album Feeling Orange but Sometimes Blue in 2002, she reached a stagnation in her music career.

I was on my rocking chair on my porch in East Oakland, and I was depressed. This was after I recorded two albums, but I had bills, just got divorced, hated the area, and felt like I was not growing. So I decided, 'OK. This is the day. I’m going to leave this earth.' [After hearing Nina Simone's "Trouble in Mind"] It jumped me out of my skin.

— Ledisi on Nina Simone

After hearing Nina Simone's cover version of "Trouble in Mind" on the radio, Ledisi repudiated her thoughts of suicide and revived her career. In 2006, she secured a record deal with major label Verve Forecast Records and went on to release a total of seven albums during her duration on the label. In 2017, she incorporated songs from Simone's repertoire into her concert with the National Symphony Orchestra (NSO Pops) at the Kennedy Center. In 2018, she headlined a tribute concert to Simone in New Orleans with the drummer Adonis Rose and the New Orleans Jazz Orchestra. In May 2019, she embarked on the Nina and Me Tour.

== Concert synopsis ==
During the Nina and Me Tour, Ledisi opened the show with "I Put a Spell on You" and often performed "Feeling Good" as an encore. In 2021, she revamped the set list for the tour and retitled it the Ledisi Sings Nina Tour. The set list included her single "Anything for You". Ledisi opened the show with "Feeling Good". Before performing "Trouble in Mind", she recounted how Nina Simone's version of "Trouble in Mind" helped her overcome her experiences with career stagnation, financial issues, and suicidal thoughts.

== Critical reception ==
Shaun Brady of The Inquirer referred to the concert as "a powerful evening, a fitting tribute to a complex and brilliant artist". Brenda C. Siler of The Washington Informer reviewed Ledisi's March 13th performance at John F. Kennedy Center for the Performing Arts. Siler stated, "Ledisi did not attempt to mimic Simone’s unique vocal style. It was an evening where we heard Ledisi’s multi-octave vocal range. From the moment she came on stage, it was clear Ledisi intended to spread joy."

== Ledisi: The Legend of Little Girl Blue ==
On December 13, 2019, Ledisi opened her two-week residency show Ledisi: The Legend of Little Girl Blue to Wallis Annenberg Center for the Performing Arts in Beverly Hills, California. The show was written by Ledisi and her husband Ron T. Young. It was directed by Gregg Field and produced by Billy Porter and Suzi Dietz. The residency show ended on December 29, 2019.

== Set list ==
=== Nina and Me Tour (2019) ===
1. "I Put a Spell on You"
2. "I'm Going Back Home"
3. "Be My Husband"
4. "Trouble in Mind"
5. "Four Women"
6. "Mississippi Goddam"
7. "Little Girl Blue"
8. "Take My Hand, Precious Lord"
9. "I Wish I Knew How It Would Feel to Be Free"
10. "Ne Me Quitte Pas (Don't Leave Me)"
11. "All the Way"
12. "Here Comes the Sun"
13. "Work Song"
14. "My Baby Just Cares for Me"
15. "Wild Is the Wind"

Encore

16. "Feeling Good"

=== Ledisi Sings Nina Tour (2021) ===
1. "Feeling Good"
2. "My Baby Just Cares for Me"
3. "Little Girl Blue"
4. "Good King Wenceslas"
5. "Trouble in Mind"
6. "Do I Move You?"
7. "Ne Me Quitte Pas (Don't Leave Me)"
8. "All the Way"
9. "Here Comes the Sun"
10. "Work Song"
11. "Wild Is the Wind"
12. "Baltimore"
13. "Shot Down"
14. "See-Line Woman"
15. "Anything for You"
16. "I Put a Spell on You"
17. "I'm Going Back Home"

=== Notes ===
- The set list for Nina and Me Tour was often rearranged for different dates.

== Tour dates ==
List of 2019 concerts showing date, city, country, venue and opening acts
Date	City	Country	Venue
May 10	Rodney Bay	Saint Lucia	Saint Lucia Jazz and Arts Festival
June 7	St. Louis	United States	Powell Hall
July 12	Bethesda	United States	The Music Center at Strathmore
August 21	London	England	Royal Albert Hall
August 26	Amsterdam	Netherlands	Concertgebouw
September 6	Hammond	United States	Horseshoe Casino
October 4	Hammond	United States	Horseshoe Casino
October 18	Atlanta	United States	Atlanta Symphony Hall
October 19	Baltimore	United States	Lyric Baltimore

List of 2021 concerts showing date, city, country, venue and opening acts
Date	City	Country	Venue
July 24, 2021	Los Angeles	United States	Hollywood Bowl
July 30, 2021	Newport	United States	Newport Jazz Festival
August 17, 2021	San Diego	United States	The Rady Shell at Jacobs Park

List of 2022 concerts showing date, city, country, venue and opening acts
Date	City	Country	Venue
January 12, 2022	St. Petersburg	United States	Duke Energy Center
January 13, 2022	West Palm Beach	United States	Kravis Center
January 14, 2022	Miami	United States	Adrienne Arsht Center for the Performing Arts
January 15, 2022	Tallahassee	United States	Ruby Diamond Concert Hall
March 13, 2022	Washington, D.C.	United States	Kennedy Center
July 22, 2022	Philadelphia	United States	The Mann Center

List of 2023 concerts showing date, city, country, venue and opening acts
Date	City	Country	Venue
February 23, 2023	New York City	United States	Carnegie Hall
September 8, 2023	San Francisco	United States	Davies Symphony Hall
September 15, 2023	New York City	United States	Pittsburgh International Jazz Festival

== Personnel ==
=== Nina and Me Tour ===
- New Orleans Jazz Orchestra (May 10, 2019)
- The L.A.B Trio (July 12, 2019, October 4–19, 2019)
  - Music Director/Piano: Brandon Waddles
  - Bass: Jeremy George
  - Drums: John Davis
- Metropole Orkest (August 21, 2019 and August 26, 2019)

=== Ledisi Sings Nina Tour ===
- San Diego Symphony (August 17, 2021)
- Philadelphia Orchestra (July 22, 2022)
- Nashville Symphony (November 6, 2022)
- Magik*Magik Orchestra (September 9, 2023)

Note: This list does not include the individual personnel of orchestras or symphonies.

== Broadcasts and recordings ==
Ledisi: A Night of Nina

Live album / video by Ledisi
- Released: November 18, 2022
- Recorded: February 1, 2020
- Venue: Smith Center for the Performing Arts (Los Angeles, California)
- Genre: Jazz; classical; blues
- Length: 55:00
- Label: Fig Street Films
- Director: Ron T. Young
- Producer: Ledisi; Ron T. Young; Myron Marton; Gregg Field; Tim Swift; Benny Biggs

On November 16, 2020, Ledisi announced the concert special Ledisi Live: A Tribute to Nina Simone via her Facebook. Professional footage from the tour aired on American television network PBS on November 28, 2020. The concert special was recorded at Myron's Jazz Cabaret in the Smith Center for the Performing Arts in Las Vegas, Nevada on February 1, 2020, by Ledisi's film company Fig Street Films. On November 18, 2022, Ledisi released Ledisi: A Night of Nina which was distributed exclusively through PBS.

=== Track listing ===
Ledisi: A Night of Nina
No.	Title	Length
1.	"I Wish I Knew What it Would Feel to Be Free"
2.	"Feeling Good"
3.	"I Want a Little Sugar in my Bowl"
4.	"See-Line Woman"
5.	"My Baby Just Cares for Me"
6.	"Ne Me Quitte Pas Wild is the Wind"
7.	"Baltimore"
8.	"Four Women"
9.	"Here Comes the Sun"
10.	"I Put a Spell on You"
11.	"Do I Move You"
12.	"I'm Going Back Home"
13.	"Trouble in Mind"
Total length:		55:00

=== Personnel ===
Production

- Executive producers: Ledisi, Ron T. Young, Myron Marton,
- Producers: Tim Swift, Gregg Field
- Production manager: Benny Biggs
- Makeup artist: Terrell Terry Jr
- Hair stylist: Tony Walker
- Teleprompter operator: Gigi Koury

Band

- Musical director: Brandon Waddles
- Guitar: Michael Nomad Ripoll
- Bass: David Parks
- Drums: Brian Collier
- Percussion: Ronald Gutierrez
- Backup vocalists: Keisha Renee Lewis, Shannon Pearson, Sara Williams
