= The Wild Card Tour =

2021 concert tour by Ledisi

- Tour by Ledisi
- Promotional poster for the tour
- Location: North America
- Associated album: The Wild Card
- Start date: October 13, 2021
- End date: November 18, 2021
- Legs: 1
- No. of shows: 22

Ledisi concert chronology
- Nina and Me Tour (2019); The Wild Card Tour (2021); Ledisi Sings Nina Tour (2021-2023)

The Wild Card Tour was the eighth concert tour by American singer Ledisi, in support of her ninth studio album The Wild Card (2020).

== Background and development ==
During the COVID-19 pandemic, Ledisi was unable to tour to support the release of her album The Wild Card. On June 18, 2021, Ledisi announced the Wild Card Tour via her Facebook account. Kenyon Dixon and Stout were also announced as the tour's opening acts. In response to the restrictions being lifted, Ledisi stated, "After bringing the show to my audience virtually and in a recording, I’m so excited to be back performing the shows live and in person!".

The concert run began on October 13, 2021, at Paramount Theatre in Austin, Texas. The tour concluded on November 18, 2021, at Carolina Theatre in Durham, North Carolina. The set list of the shows included songs from all of Ledisi albums, with the exception of Soulsinger (2000) and Feeling Orange but Sometimes Blue (2002). Tickets were distributed through Ticketmaster. Taft Theatre in Cincinnati, Ohio, held a contest to giveaway two reserved tickets for her show on November 5, 2021.

== Recordings ==
On September 12, 2020, she gave on a free virtual concert titled This One's for You: A Night of Ledisi Live, which was orchestrated due to the COVID-19 pandemic restrictions. The in-studio concert was recorded at the Troubadour in West Hollywood, California and released as a live album titled Ledisi Live at The Troubadour on April 30, 2021.

== Set list ==
1. "High"
2. "Add to Me"
3. "WKND"
4. "Knockin'"
5. "Alright"
6. "Anything for You"
7. "Best Friend"
8. "All the Way"
9. "Same Love"
10. "In the Morning"
11. "Stay Together"
12. "Love Never Changes"
13. "Pieces of Me"
14. "I Blame You"

== Tour dates ==
List of 2021 concerts showing date, city, country, venue and opening acts
Date	City	Country	Venue	Opening acts
October 13	Austin	United States	Paramount Theatre	Kenyon Dixon
October 14	Houston	United States	Cullen Theatre	Kenyon Dixon
October 15	Grand Prairie	United States	Theatre At Grand Prairie	Kenyon Dixon
October 17	New Orleans	United States	New Orleans Jazz & Heritage Festival	—
October 19	Charlotte	United States	Knight Theater	Kenyon Dixon
October 20	Greenville	United States	Peace Center	—
October 22	Atlantic City	United States	Circus Maximus	—
October 23	Newark	United States	New Jersey Performing Arts Center	Kenyon Dixon
October 24	Westbury	United States	Theater At Westbury	Kenyon Dixon
October 26	Bethesda	United States	Strathmore	Kenyon Dixon
October 27	Wallingford	United States	Oakdale	Kenyon Dixon
November 4	Kalamazoo	United States	Kalamazoo State Theatre	Kenyon Dixon
November 5	Cincinnati	United States	Taft Theatre	Kenyon Dixon
November 6	Hammond	United States	Horseshoe Casino	Kenyon Dixon
November 7	Indianapolis	United States	Gyptian Room	Kenyon Dixon
November 8	Cleveland	United States	House of Blues	Kenyon Dixon
November 12	Chattanooga	United States	Tivoli Theater	Kenyon Dixon
November 13	Tunica Resorts	United States	Horseshoe Tunica	Kenyon Dixon
November 14	Birmingham	United States	The Lyric Theatre	Stout
November 16	Atlanta	United States	Atlanta Symphony Hall	Stout
November 17	Charleston	United States	Charleston Music Hall	Stout
November 18	Durham	United States	Carolina Theater	Stout
