= Four Women (song) =

Single by Nina Simone

from the album Wild Is the Wind
- B-side: "What More Can I Say"
- Released: April 1966
- Recorded: 1965
- Genre: Soul, jazz
- Label: Philips
- Songwriter: Nina Simone
- Producer: Hal Mooney

"Four Women" is a song written by Nina Simone, released on the 1966 album Wild Is the Wind. It tells the story of four African American women and portrays four archetypal figures of Black women in the United States: Aunt Sarah, Saffronia, Sweet Thing and Peaches. It is through these Four Women that Nina Simone explores the intersecting burdens of race, gender, class, systemic oppression and generational trauma. Thulani Davis of The Village Voice called the song "an instantly accessible analysis of the damning legacy of slavery, that made iconographic the real women we knew and would become."

== African-American female archetypes ==
- The first of the four women described in the song is Aunt Sarah. She is introduced with the lyric "My skin is black," and her narrative emphasizes long-suffering resilience, with lines such as "strong enough to take the pain / inflicted again and again," reflecting the historical legacy of slavery and forced labor endured by Black women.
- The second woman who appears in the song is dubbed Saffronia, a woman of mixed race ("my skin is yellow") forced to live "between two worlds". This archetype embodies themes of colorism and sexual violence under miscegenation. Her verse: "My father was rich and white / He forced my mother late one night," explicitly links her existence to the coercion of a Black woman by a white man, problematizing the idea of simply living "between two worlds."
- The third woman, Sweet Thing, is a prostitute whose narrative highlights the commodification of Black women's bodies. Her questions, "Whose little girl am I? / Anyone who has money to buy," expose the transactional and dehumanizing sexual dynamics forced upon her.
- The fourth and final woman is very tough, embittered by the generations of oppression and suffering endured by her people ("I'm awfully bitter these days/’cause my parents were slaves"). She embodies a militant and defiant rage born from generations of oppression and trauma. The song's musical arrangement intensifies to a crescendo during her verse, mirroring this escalating anger and positioning her as the culmination of the song's protest. Simone finally unveils the woman's name after a dramatic finale during which she screams, "My name is Peaches!"

== Style ==
Musically speaking the song is based on a simple groove based melody with piano, flute, electric guitar, and bass guitar accompaniment. The song gradually builds in intensity as it progresses, and reaches a climax during the fourth and final section. Simone's vocal becomes more impassioned, cracking with emotion and her steady piano playing becomes frenzied and at times dissonant, possibly to reflect the angst of the character. The song ends with Simone wailing, with conviction, the name "Peaches".

== Misinterpretation ==
Much to Simone's dismay, and despite her intention to highlight the injustice in society and the suffering of African American people, some listeners interpreted the song as racist. They believed it drew on Black stereotypes, and it was subsequently banned on several major radio stations.

== Legacy ==
This song has evolved into an enduring anthem for Black women, articulating historical and ongoing struggles with systemic oppression, colorism and stereotyping. Its exploration of intersectional identity remains a vital reference point in modern social movements including the Black Lives Matter Movement. The song's archetypes provide a powerful framework for discussing misogynoir, making it a touchstone in contemporary feminist discourse.

In 2022, American Songwriter ranked the song number seven on their list of the 10 greatest Nina Simone songs, and in 2023, The Guardian ranked the song number six on their list of the 20 greatest Nina Simone songs.

Simone's legacy and song's spirit, also serve as a foundational influence for later generations of Black female artists who use their music as a platform for social commentary and the celebration of Black womanhood. Prominent figures from Beyoncé to Janelle Monáe have been critically analyzed as inheritors of Simone's tradition of blending artistry with activism.

== Cover versions and uses in popular culture ==
- The English blues rock band Black Cat Bones covered the song on its only album, Barbed Wire Sandwich, released in 1970.
- The song was adapted by filmmaker Julie Dash into a 1978 short experimental film of the same name.
- Sandra Bernhard performs the song in her one woman show, filmed in 1990 by John Boskovich and released as the film Without You I'm Nothing.
- Merrill Nisker has performed under the name Peaches since the late 1990s, named after the character in "Four Women".
- The group Reflection Eternal, which is made up of rapper Talib Kweli and producer Hi-Tek, has a song titled "For Women", inspired by Simone's song, on its 2000 debut album Train of Thought.
- Berlin soul singer Joy Denalane, featuring Sara Tavares, Chiwoniso & Deborah, interpreted the song on her 2002 debut album Mamani.
- A cover version of this song was featured in the ending credits of the 2010 movie For Colored Girls, featuring a sample of Nina Simone singing the first verse (as Aunt Sarah) with newly re-recorded vocals performed by Nina's daughter, Lisa Simone, singing Safronia's verse, Laura Izibor singing the role of Sweet Thing, and Ledisi singing Peaches's verse.
- The song was on the 2010 show Black Girls Rock! It is covered by R&B vocalists Kelly Price as Aunt Sarah, Marsha Ambrosius as Safronia, Jill Scott as Sweet Thing, and Ledisi as Peaches.
- In 2017, Jay-Z's track "The Story of O.J." samples "Four Women," weaving Simone's vocals into a critique of colorism, identity and modern wealth in America. This sample creates a direct, intergenerational conversation between two Black artists, paying homage to Simone's bravery while extending her critque into the 21st century.
- In 2012, Meshell Ndegeocello, released an album of Simone cover songs titled "Pour une Âme Souveraine: A Dedication to Nina Simone".
- A cover version of this song by Ledisi, along with Lisa Fischer, Lizz Wright, and Alice Smith was released on Ledisi's tribute album to Nina Simone called Ledisi Sings Nina in July 2021. The song was recorded live with the Metropole Orkest at the Royal Albert Hall in London during her Nina and Me Tour in 2019.
- American experimental band Xiu Xiu covered "Four Women" on its 2013 Nina Simone tribute album Nina.
- The song inspired the 2016 play Nina Simone: Four Women by Christina Ham. In the play, Nina meets the first three women (she is the fourth) at the site of the 16th Street Baptist Church bombing, and they become the characters in her song.
- Jamaican musician Queen Ifrica released a reggae version in 2021.
