= Anything for You (Ledisi song) =

2020 single by Ledisi

Single by Ledisi

from the album The Wild Card
- Released: April 3, 2020
- Recorded: 2019
- Genre: R&B
- Length: 4:17
- Label: Listen Back Entertainment
- Songwriters: Rex Rideout; Ledisi; Jairus "J-Mo" Mozee
- Producers: Rex Rideout; Ledisi Young

Ledisi singles chronology
"All the Way" (2018)	"Anything for You" (2020)	"Wake Up" (2020)

Music video
- "Anything for You" on YouTube

"Anything for You" is a song recorded by American singer and songwriter Ledisi, from her ninth studio album, The Wild Card (2020). Listen Back Entertainment released "Anything for You" on April 3, 2020, as the lead single. "Anything for You" is a slow-tempo R&B song about cherishing one's partner and doing anything for them.

"Anything for You" won a Grammy Award for Best Traditional R&B Performance at the 63rd Annual Grammy Awards in 2021, marking her first Grammy Award win. It topped the US Billboard Adult R&B Songs chart for two consecutive weeks.

== Development and release ==
I was sitting on it for a long time in August, and I came back to it. One day, I was talking to Rex [Rideout] and his family after his father passed away. We were talking about how the love of family never goes away. Afterward, I went right to my room and after an hour-and-a-half, there was a song inspired by a conversation.

— Ledisi (Rolling Out interview)

The song was inspired by the death of her long-time music producer Rex Rideout's father. "Anything for You" was released on April 3, 2020, almost a month after COVID-19 was declared a pandemic. Although the song was not written or released in response to the pandemic, Ledisi told digital media brand Hollywood Life that she hoped the song would inspire listeners to "fully live in every moment and love their family/friends in every way possible." "Anything for You" is also the first single to be released on Ledisi's independent recording label Listen Back Entertainment.

"Anything for You" is performed in the key of D. Jairus Mozee, who co-wrote the song, also played guitar on the song. On July 31, 2020, a duet version with PJ Morton was released.

== Critical reception ==
Jason Brow of Hollywood Life called the song "a magnificent slice of soul and R&B, another demonstration of Ledisi’s prowess as a singer and a songwriter."

At the 63rd Annual Grammy Awards in 2021, "Anything for You" won a Grammy Award for Best Traditional R&B Performance. The award win marks her first Grammy Award win. The solo version and duet version of the song were nominated for Outstanding Soul/R&B Song and Outstanding Duo, Group, or Collaboration at the 52nd NAACP Image Awards in 2021.

== Commercial performance ==
"Anything for You" was a commercial success in the United States, debuting at number forty-four on the US Billboard Adult R&B Songs. During the twenty-fifth week of its chart run on October 10, 2020, the song peaked at number one on and held the top position for a total of two weeks. On September 26, 2020, "Anything for You" debuted on the Hot R&B Songs at number twenty-three, which became its peak position. The song remained on the charts for two weeks.

== Music video ==
The music video of "Anything for You", released in April 2020, was directed by Ledisi's husband Ron T. Young, who also shot her previous music video "High". The music video concept was simplified and filmed with minimal alternative camera shots and cuts, and no changes to hairstyles, or costumes.

The video begins with an opening shot of a record player and the music begins as Ledisi walks into a recording studio. She is then shown performing the song in front of a condenser microphone. The video alternates between the studio performance and Ledisi performing the song in a different location in the studio. The video ends Ledisi standing next to the record player.

The music video received a nomination for Outstanding Music Video at the 52nd NAACP Image Awards in 2021.

== Live performances ==
On May 20, 2020, Ledisi uploaded a "Quarantine Acoustic Version" of the song to her YouTube channel. On July 4, 2020, Ledisi performed "Anything for You" on virtual live stream concert for 2020 Essence Music Festival. On November 6, 2020, Ledisi performed the song on the Kelly Clarkson Show.

The song was a part of Ledisi's set list for her concert tour The Wild Card Tour in 2021 and performed halfway through the show. During the COVID-19 pandemic, Ledisi was unable to tour in the latter part of 2020. On September 12, 2020, she gave on a free virtual concert titled This One's for You: A Night of Ledisi Live. Audio from Ledisi's performance of "Anything for You" at the Troubadour in West Hollywood, California was released on her live album Ledisi Live at The Troubadour (2021). The song was also part of the set list for The Good Life Tour in 2024.

== Track listing ==
- Digital download
1. "Anything for You"
- Digital download 2
1. "Anything for You (The Duet)" (featuring PJ Morton)

== Credits and personnel ==
Credits are adapted from The Wild Card liner notes.

- Vocals: Ledisi Young
- Piano, production: Rex Rideout
- Guitar: Jairus Mozee
- Bass guitar: David Parks
- Drums: Brian Collier
- Mix engineers: Ray Bardani, Reuben Cohen
