= Hits (magazine) =

American music industry trade publication

- Categories: Music industry trade magazine
- Founder: Lenny Beer; Dennis Lavinthal
- First issue: August 4, 1986; 40 years ago
- Country: United States
- Based in: Hollywood, Los Angeles
- Language: English
- Website: hitsdailydouble.com
- OCLC: 15994494

Hits (stylized in all caps) is an American music industry trade publication. Founded by Lenny Beer and Dennis Lavinthal, who had previously worked in independent promotion, it was launched as a print magazine in August 1986. By 1997, it had become the most successful tip sheet in the music world.

An online version of the magazine, Hits Daily Double, premiered in May 2000. Both on and offline, the magazine's content includes proprietary weekly sales and airplay data, a section on breaking artists ("Vibe-Raters"), interviews with music industry leaders, a weekly cartoon, music and music industry news, and charts provided by Shazam, Vevo, and Mediabase. The "Rumor Mill" column, described as "music industry news and innuendo," has been widely read within the music business since the magazine's launch.
