= Soul Train Music Award for Soul Train Certified Award =

Annual US music award

This page lists the winners and nominees for the Soul Train Music Soul Train Certified Award, formerly the Centric Award. The award has been given out since the 2009 ceremony.

== Winners and nominees ==
Winners are listed first and highlighted in bold.

=== 2000s ===
Year	Artist	Ref
2009
2009	**Maysa**	
2009	Corneille	
2009	Laura Izibor	
2009	The Knux	
2009	Eric Roberson	

=== 2010s ===
Year	Artist	Ref
2010
2010	**Janelle Monáe**	
2010	Corrine Bailey Rae	
2010	Jesse Boykins III	
2010	Dondria	
2010	Dwele	
2011
2011	**Raphael Saadiq**	
2011	Aloe Blacc	
2011	Bilal	
2011	Anthony David	
2011	Ledisi	
2012
2012	**Leah LaBelle**	
2012	Gary Clark, Jr.	
2012	Daley	
2012	Santigold	
2012	Esperanza Spalding	
2013
2013	**Luke James**	
2013	Stacy Barthe	
2013	Lyfe Jennings	
2013	Talib Kweli	
2013	Solange	
2013	Joss Stone	
2014
2014	**Leela James**	
2014	AverySunshine	
2014	Robert Glasper	
2014	Kelis	
2014	Luke James	
2014	Shaliek	
2015
2015	**Tyrese**	
2015	Avant	
2015	Vivian Green	
2015	The Internet	
2015	Chrisette Michele	
2016
2016	**Anderson .Paak**	
2016	After 7	
2016	Bilal	
2016	Lalah Hathaway	
2016	Musiq Soulchild	
2017
2017	**Bell Biv Devoe**	
2017	**Ledisi**	
2017	Johnny Gill	
2017	Lalah Hathaway	
2017	Mack Wilds	
2018
2018	**Ledisi**	
2018	Ashanti	
2018	Jorja Smith	
2018	Lenny Kravitz	
2018	MAJOR.	
2018	Tamia	
2019
2019	**Trevor Jackson**	
2019	Ciara	
2019	Daniel Caesar	
2019	Fantasia	
2019	India Arie	
2019	Kelly Rowland	

=== 2020s ===
Year	Artist	Ref
2020
2020	**Brandy**	
2020	Fantasia	
2020	Kelly Rowland	
2020	Ledisi	
2020	Monica	
2020	PJ Morton	
2021
2021	**Charlie Wilson**	
2021	Anthony Hamilton	
2021	Ashanti	
2021	Isley Brothers	
2021	Jimmy Jam and Terry Lewis	
2021	T-Pain	
2022
2022	**Mary J. Blige**	
2022	Chaka Khan	
2022	Charlie Wilson	
2022	Diana Ross	
2022	Maxwell	
2022	PJ Morton	
2022	Ronald Isley & The Isley Brothers	
2022	T-Pain	
2023
2023	**Usher**	
2023	Anthony Hamilton	
2023	Ashanti	
2023	Ciara	
2023	Eric Bellinger	
2023	Monica	
2023	PJ Morton	
2023	Ronald Isley & The Isley Brothers	
2023	T-Pain	
