= Soulsinger =

- Standard edition cover

Studio album by Ledisi
- Released: January 1, 2000
- Genres: R&B; soul; funk
- Length: 71:10
- Label: LeSun
- Producers: Ledisi Young, Sundra Manning

Ledisi chronology
Soulsinger (2000)	Feeling Orange but Sometimes Blue (2002)

Alternative cover
- Soulsinger: The Revival cover

Soulsinger is the debut studio album by the American singer-songwriter Ledisi. It was released on January 1, 2000, on her label LeSun Records. In 2003, the album was reissued as Soulsinger: The Revival by Tommy Boy Records. It was nominated for a Bammie, for Best R&B album.

== Production ==
Soulsinger was written and produced by Ledisi and Sundra Manning.

== Critical reception ==
Professional ratings
Review scores
Source	Rating
AllMusic	3/5 stars
The Encyclopedia of Popular Music	4/5 stars
USA Today	3/4 stars
Vibe	4/5 stars

AllMusic wrote that "cool jazzy flavors (including the catchy 'I Wantcha Babe') and sweet floaters ('Take Time' and 'In My Life') balance the more dramatic cuts and provide a comfortable plateau for Ledisi's fluid alto." The San Francisco Chronicle wrote: "One moment sad and sweet, loud and fierce the next, [Ledisi's] music is part down-home lovin' and good advice."

== Track listing ==
- Standard edition
1. "Get Outta My Kitchen" (Ledisi Young, Sundra Manning) – 3:51
2. "Soulsinger" (Young, Manning) – 3:51
3. "Take Time" (Young, Manning, Nelson Braxton) – 5:11
4. "Stop Livin' in Ya Head" (Young, Manning) – 4:42
5. "Coffee" (Young, Manning) – 5:32
6. "You Are My Friend" (Young, Manning) – 4:12
7. "Hotel" (Young, Manning) – 3:43
8. "Dreaming Interlude" (Young, Manning) – 1:43
9. "Free Again" (Young, Manning, LeGerald Normand) – 4:49
10. "Groove On" (Young, Manning, Paisley) – 5:34
11. "I Want'cha Babe" (Young, Manning) – 4:32
12. "I Want'cha Babe Interlude" (Young, Manning) – 1:11
13. "Papa Loved to Love Me" (Young, Manning) – 3:45
14. "In My Life" (Young, Manning) – 4:51
15. "My Prayers" (Young, Manning) – 4:38
16. "Good Lovin'" (Young, Manning) – 3:41
17. "Snoring" – 0:29

=== Soulsinger: The Revival ===
- Reissue edition
1. "Get Outta My Kitchen" (Ledisi Young, Sundra Manning) – 3:51
2. "Stop Livin' in Ya Head" (Young, Manning) – 4:42
3. "Take Time" (Young, Manning, Nelson Braxton) – 5:11
4. "You Are My Friend" (Young, Manning) – 4:12
5. "Coffee" (Young, Manning) – 5:32
6. "Good Lovin'" (Young, Manning) – 3:41
7. "Hotel" (Young, Manning) – 3:43
8. "Dreaming Interlude" (Young, Manning) – 1:43
9. "Free Again" (Young, Manning, LeGerald Normand) – 4:49
10. "Soulsinger" (Young, Manning) – 3:51
11. "My Prayers" (Young, Manning) – 4:38
12. "In My Life" (Young, Manning) – 4:51
13. "Groove On" (Young, Manning, Paisley) – 5:34
14. "I Want'cha Babe" (Young, Manning) – 4:32
15. "I Want'cha Babe Interlude" (Young, Manning) – 1:11
16. "Papa Loved to Love Me" (Young, Manning) – 3:45
17. "Soulsinger" (Live) (Young, Manning) – 4:27
18. "Hold on to Love" (Young, Manning, Me'Shell Ndegéocello) – 4:37
19. "Snoring" – 0:29
