= Ledisi =

American singer-songwriter, author and actress (born 1972)

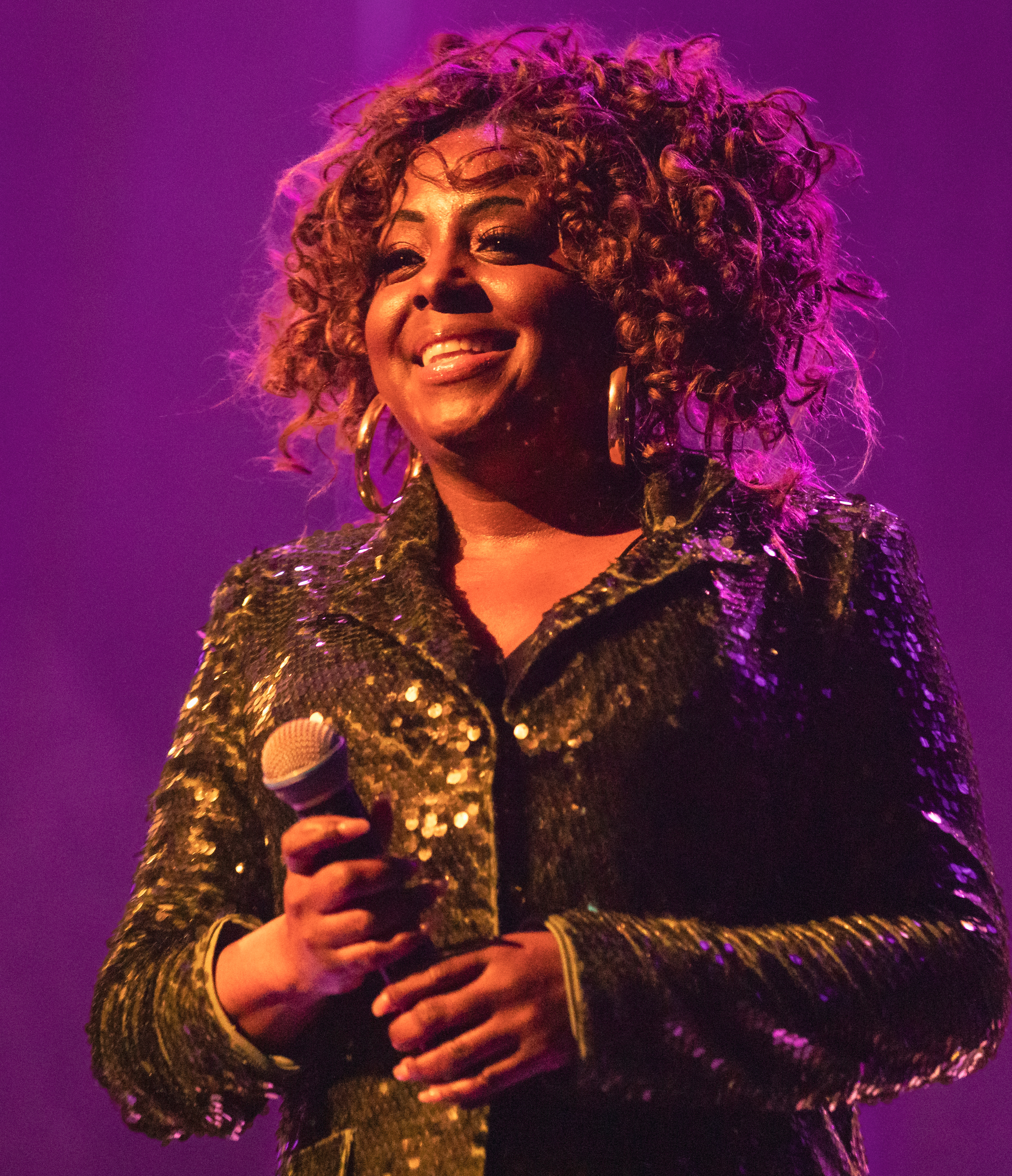
- Ledisi in 2024

Background information
- Born: Ledisi Anibade Young; March 28, 1972 (age 54); New Orleans, Louisiana, U.S.
- Origin: Oakland, California, U.S.
- Genres: R&B; jazz; neo soul
- Occupations: Singer; songwriter; actress; author
- Instruments: Vocals, piano
- Years active: 1990–present
- Labels: Listen Back Entertainment; BMG; Verve; LeSun Music
- Website: https://www.ledisi.com/

Ledisi Anibade Young (/ˈlɛdɪsiː/; born March 28, 1972), better known simply as Ledisi, is an American singer-songwriter, music producer, author, and actress. Her name means "to bring forth" or "to come here" in Yoruba.

In 1995, Ledisi formed a band after her middle name Anibade. After unsuccessfully trying to get signed to a major label, she formed LeSun Music with musician Sundra Manning. She released her debut album Soulsinger (2000), which featured the single "Take Time", which gained substantial airplay from San Francisco area radio stations. In 2002, Ledisi released her second album, Feeling Orange but Sometimes Blue, which won "Outstanding Jazz Album" at the California Music Awards in 2003. In 2006, Ledisi signed a record deal with Verve Forecast and released her third album, titled Lost & Found (2007). The album earned her two Grammy nominations, including one for Best New Artist. She released six more albums on Verve: It's Christmas (2008), Turn Me Loose (2009), Pieces of Me (2011), The Truth (2014), The Intimate Truth (2015), and Let Love Rule (2017).

In 2020, Ledisi released her ninth album The Wild Card on her own record label Listen Back Entertainment. The album's single "Anything for You" won a Grammy Award for Best Traditional R&B Performance at the 63rd Annual Grammy Awards. She released four more albums on her label including Ledisi Live at The Troubadour (2021), Ledisi Sings Nina (2021), Good Life (2024), and The Crown (2025).

Aside from music, Ledisi has embarked a career in film and television as an actress. She portrayed gospel icon Mahalia Jackson in the films Selma (2014) and Remember Me: The Mahalia Jackson Story (2022). Other roles include a guest appearance as Patti LaBelle in the BET docudrama American Soul, a cameo appearance as a choir member in the FX drama Pose (both 2020), as well as co-starring as Gladys Knight in the film Spinning Gold (2023). She also starred in her first Hallmark original movie, All Saints Christmas (2022).

== Early life ==
Ledisi Anibade Young was born on March 28, 1972, in New Orleans, Louisiana, to Nyra Dynese Young, a singer-songwriter in local band Coronava, and Larry Saunders, a 1970s singer and musician. Saunders departed from the family when Ledisi was a baby. Her mother remarried to a drummer named Joseph Pierce III, who adopted Ledisi after the marriage. She has an older sister, Shannon, and a younger sister. Ledisi's biological paternal grandfather, Johnny Ace, was an American blues singer who was known for his single "Pledging My Love".

Ledisi was raised Catholic and attended local churches in New Orleans. Her mother was raised Baptist. At the age of eight, she performed publicly with the New Orleans Symphony Orchestra. At age thirteen, her family relocated to Oakland, California, where she went to Edna Brewer Middle School, formerly McChesney Junior High School. She later enrolled in Skyline High School, from which she graduated in 1990.

== Career ==
=== 1990–1999: Career beginnings ===
In 1990, she starred as the lead character Dorothy in an Antioch Community Theater production of The Wiz in Antioch, California. Her performance earned a Shellie Award nomination in the same year. She also joined a cabaret production of Beach Blanket Babylon in San Francisco. She earned a scholarship and attended the University of California, Berkeley, where she studied piano and opera. Ledisi was briefly part of an acid jazz group called Slide Five. Ledisi formed her own funk band called Anibade. The band performed around the San Francisco Bay Area, building notoriety in the area. After the group failed to secure a record deal, Ledisi and keyboardist Sundra Manning formed their own label LeSun Music.

=== 2000–2004: Soulsinger and Feeling Orange but Sometimes Blue ===
In 2000, Ledisi released her first album Soulsinger, which featured the band Anibade, on LeSun Music. The album featured the single "Take Time" and received positive reviews. In 2002, she released her second album Feeling Orange but Sometimes Blue. The album featured jazz standards "'Round Midnight", "In a Sentimental Mood", and "Autumn Leaves (Les feuilles mortes)". The album won "Outstanding Jazz Album" at the California Music Awards in 2003.

In August 2003, Ledisi and Anibade performed at the San Jose Jazz Festival. She also released a 4-track extended play titled Ledisi & Anibade – "Live" The Bootleg Recordings Vol. 1. In the same year, she reissued her first album under the title Soulsinger: The Revival, distributed by Tommy Boy Records. In May 2004, Ledisi portrayed two characters, The Washing Machine and The Radio, in the Broadway production of Caroline, or Change.

=== 2007–2010: Lost & Found and Verve Records ===
In 2006, Ledisi secured a major record deal with Verve Forecast, a subsidiary of Verve Records. Ledisi had been recording her third album Lost & Found prior to her record deal. The album was released on August 28, 2007. Lost & Found peaked at number 10 on Billboard's R&B Albums chart and sold over 237,000 copies in the United States. The album's lead single "Alright" peaked at number 11 on the Adult R&B Songs chart.

During her tour in February 2008, she performed at the Highline Ballroom in New York City. She received positive feedback from critics for her emotional performance, which was described as a "religious experience". In March 2008, "In the Morning" was released as the second single and peaked at number fifteen on the Adult R&B Songs chart. The album earned Ledisi two nominations at the 50th Annual Grammy Awards, for Best R&B Album and Best New Artist. She made a cameo appearance in the comedy film Leatherheads as a blues singer who performed the pop standard "The Man I Love" in April 2008. In September 2008, she released her Christmas album titled It's Christmas.

Her fifth album Turn Me Loose was released in August 2009, peaking atop of the Billboard Top R&B/Hip-Hop Albums chart. To promote the album, she joined with multi-cultural beauty brand Carol's Daughter, with whom she ran an advertising promotion that included a brand sampler. The album's first single "Goin' Thru Changes" peaked at number forty-three on the Hot R&B/Hip-Hop Songs chart and number fifteen on the Adult R&B Songs chart. The follow-up single "Higher Than This" peaked at number twenty-two on the Adult R&B Songs chart. The album earned two nominations at the 52nd Annual Grammy Awards, for Best R&B Album and "Goin' Thru Changes" earning a nomination for Best Female R&B Vocal Performance.

=== 2011–2019: Pieces of Me and subsequent releases ===
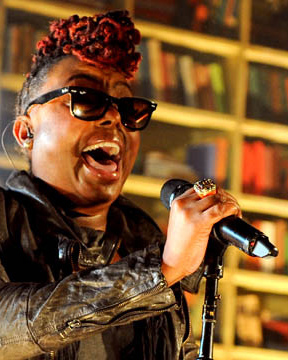
Ledisi performing at Walmart Soundcheck in 2011

In June 2011, Ledisi released her sixth album Pieces of Me. The album debuted at number eight on the Billboard 200 and peaked at number two on the Billboard's R&B Albums. The album's lead single "Pieces of Me" became one of her most successful songs on the Billboard chart, peaking at number two on the Adult R&B Songs and number nineteen on the Hot R&B/Hip-Hop Songs. "Pieces of Me" also earned a gold certification by the RIAA. She headlined her first major tour called the Pieces of Me Tour, which went on to play to over twenty-two sold-out shows. The success of the album earned three nominations at the 54th Annual Grammy Awards, including Best R&B Album, Best R&B Song (for the song "Pieces of Me"), and Best R&B Performance (for the song "Pieces of Me"). In April 2012, she headlined her second tour called the B.G.T.Y. Tour. In June 2012, Ledisi released her first book titled Better Than Alright: Finding Peace, Love & Power, on Time Home Entertainment, Inc.

Her seventh album The Truth was released in March 2014. The album spawned the top-ten Billboard Adult R&B Songs "I Blame You" and "Like This". The song "Like This" received a Grammy Award nomination for Best R&B Performance in 2015. In April 2014, Ledisi portrayed American singer Mahalia Jackson in the American historical drama film, Selma. It is based on the 1965 Selma to Montgomery marches for voting rights in Alabama, led by James Bevel, Martin Luther King Jr., and Hosea Williams. In the film and on the film's soundtrack, Ledisi performed "Take My Hand, Precious Lord". In January 2015, Ledisi released a studio live extended play titled The Intimate Truth. A month later, she embarked on The Intimate Truth Tour.

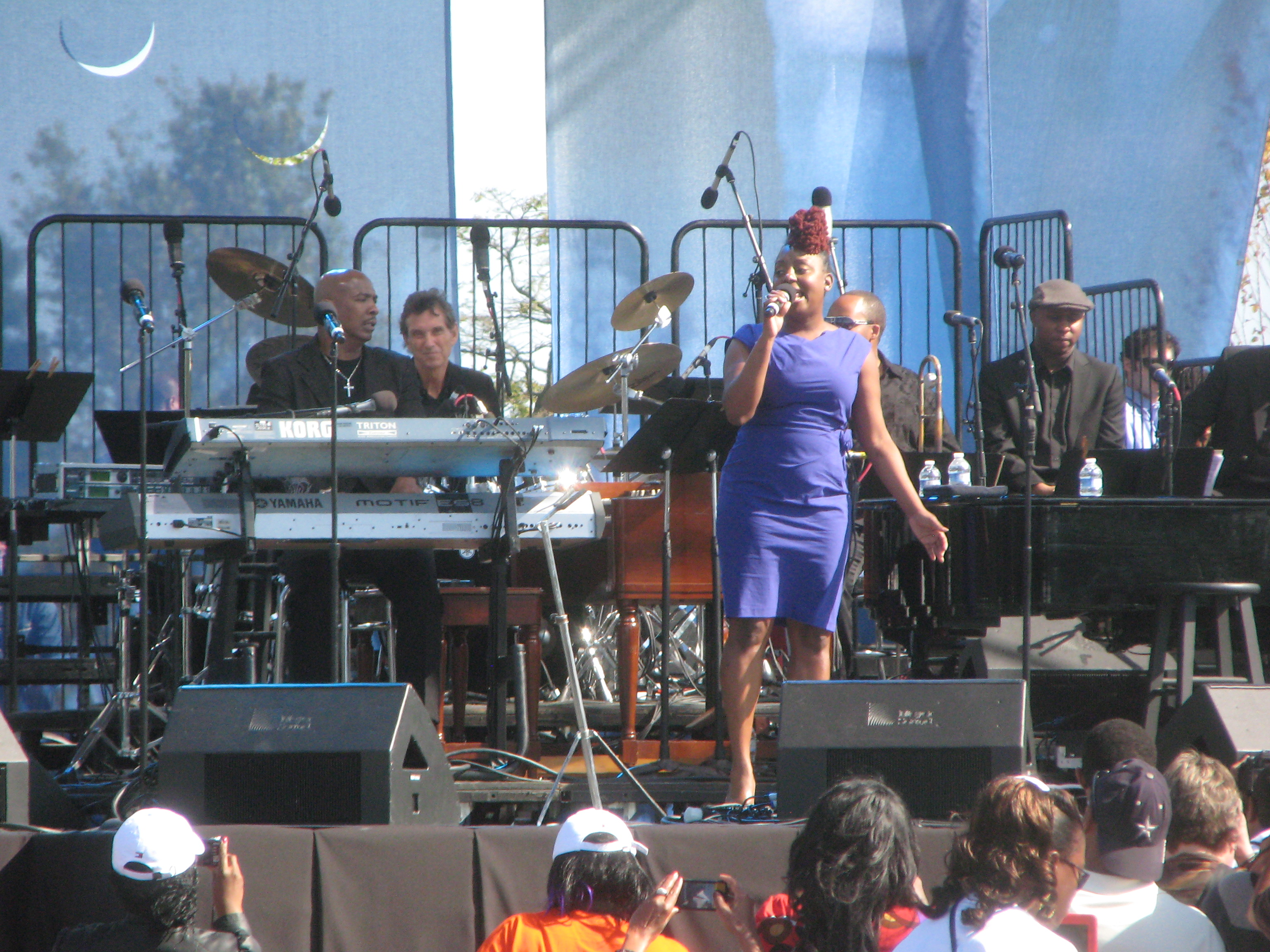
Ledisi performing at the Martin Luther King Jr. Memorial dedication concert in October 2011

In May 2017, Ledisi released a single titled "High". She released her eighth studio album titled Let Love Rule on September 22, 2017. Let Love Rule received three nominations at the 60th Grammy Awards in January 2018 including Best R&B Album, Best R&B Performance and Best Traditional R&B Performance. She won a Soul Train Certified Award at the 2018 Soul Train Music Awards. In June 2018, she performed "Sweet Love" in tribute to Anita Baker. In the same year, she performed "Ain't No Way" in tribute to Aretha Franklin at Black Girls Rock!. She released an autobiography titled The Walk: Accepting Your Life As It Is Now in August 2018. In October 2018, Ledisi performed "As Long as You're Mine" with Adam Lambert in an NBC broadcast, A Very Wicked Halloween: Celebrating 15 Years on Broadway. In 2019, she portrayed the Ancestor in the Off-Broadway theatre production of Witness Uganda. In the same year, she co-wrote and co-produced her residency show titled Ledisi: The Legend of Little Girl Blue, which sold out in nineteen shows.

=== 2020–2024: The Wild Card, Ledisi Sings Nina, and Good Life ===
In January 2020, Ledisi released her third book, Don't Ever Lose Your Walk: How to Embrace Your Journey. In June 2020, Ledisi announced the title of her ninth studio album, The Wild Card. The album was released on August 28, 2020, exactly thirteen years after her major label debut, Lost & Found. The Wild Card was the first album to be released on Ledisi's independent label Listen Back Entertainment, distributed by BMG. The album's lead single "Anything for You" became Ledisi's first number-one song on Billboard's Adult R&B Songs chart, remaining in the top position for two weeks. The song also won a Grammy Award for Best Traditional R&B Performance in 2021, marking her first Grammy Award win. On April 30, 2021, Ledisi released a live album, Ledisi Live at The Troubadour.

Having previously appeared live at the BBC Prom 45 Mississippi Goddam (A Homage to Nina Simone) on August 21, 2019, she released Ledisi Sings Nina on July 23, 2021, a tribute album to American singer Nina Simone, to favorable reviews from music critics. Ledisi Sings Nina debuted at number two on Billboard's Classical Crossover Albums chart, spending a total of fifteen weeks on the chart. At the 64th Annual Grammy Awards in 2023, Ledisi Sings Nina received a nomination for Best Traditional Pop Vocal Album. On March 1, 2023, Ledisi performed "River" with Herbie Hancock in honor of Joni Mitchell at the Library of Congress Gershwin Prize concert. In March 2024, she released her eleventh studio album Good Life. The album's first single "I Need to Know" became her second number-one on the US Adult R&B Songs chart.

=== 2025–present: The Crown and For Dinah ===
Ledisi at the Broadway opening of Wanted in 2026

On January 31, 2025, Ledisi released "Love You Too"; the lead single from her forthcoming album. The song peaked at number 14 on the US Adult R&B chart. On February 9, 2025, Ledisi performed the "Lift Every Voice and Sing" at Super Bowl LIX, at the Caesars Superdome in New Orleans, Louisiana. The Love You Too Tour was announced on February 10, 2025, with dates scheduled from May 28 through June 29. On April 25, 2025, Ledisi released her twelfth studio album The Crown. In July 2025, Ledisi announced her thirteenth studio album For Dinah, a tribute album to American singer Dinah Washington. In the same month, she embarked on her European Tour. On July 18, 2025, she released the album's first single "This Bitter Earth". In August 2025, Ledisi announced the upcoming of her concert tours: Ledisi for Dinah Tour, and The Crown Tour.

On October 3, 2025, Ledisi released her thirteenth studio album For Dinah. In May 2026, it was announced that Ledisi would star as Tallulah Clarke in the Broadway production of Wanted: The Legend of the Sisters Clarke, which opened on November 8, 2026. In October 2026, she re-released her album For Dinah with additional tracks, including the singles "Teach Me Tonight" and "Nobody Knows the Way I Feel This Morning".

== Artistry ==
=== Voice and musical style ===
Ledisi's voice is classified as a four-octave mezzo-soprano. She has been described as a "vocal powerhouse" and "one of the most distinctive voices of 21st century rhythm and blues". Music critic Salamishah Tillet of The New York Times praised her voice for its "diversity and breathtaking range". Fellow musician John Legend commented "As a contemporary vocalist, there’s almost no one I can think of in the world that sings as skillfully as she does. In terms of her range, dexterity, clarity, versatility, she can do anything she wants. She’s one of the great singers in the world, period". She is also known for scatting.

Her music includes various styles of musical genres such as contemporary R&B, jazz, funk, pop, and soul. Her debut album Soulsinger (2000) followed a contemporary R&B sound, while her second album Feeling Orange but Sometimes Blue featured a jazz sound. In an interview with DownBeat, Ledisi expressed wanting to be viewed as more than a R&B singer after the release of her album Ledisi Sings Nina (2021). "I’m not your boxed R&B singer. I’m more than that. I studied classical. It just so happens that I’m loved for R&B, but my home base goes over into all these other worlds".

=== Influences ===
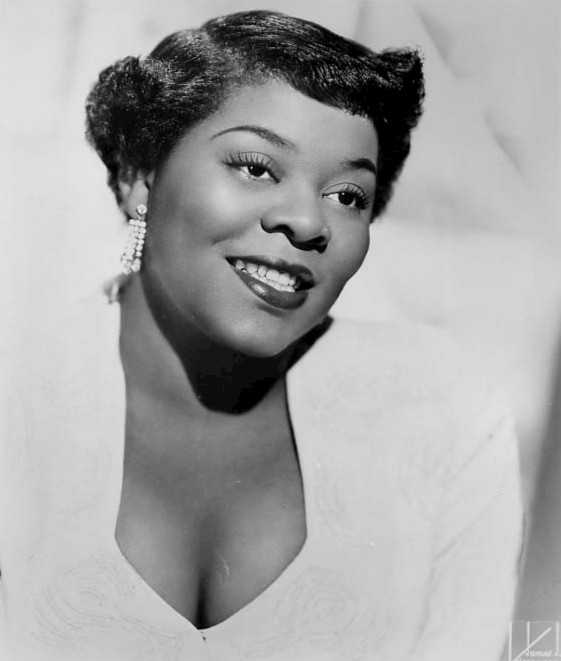
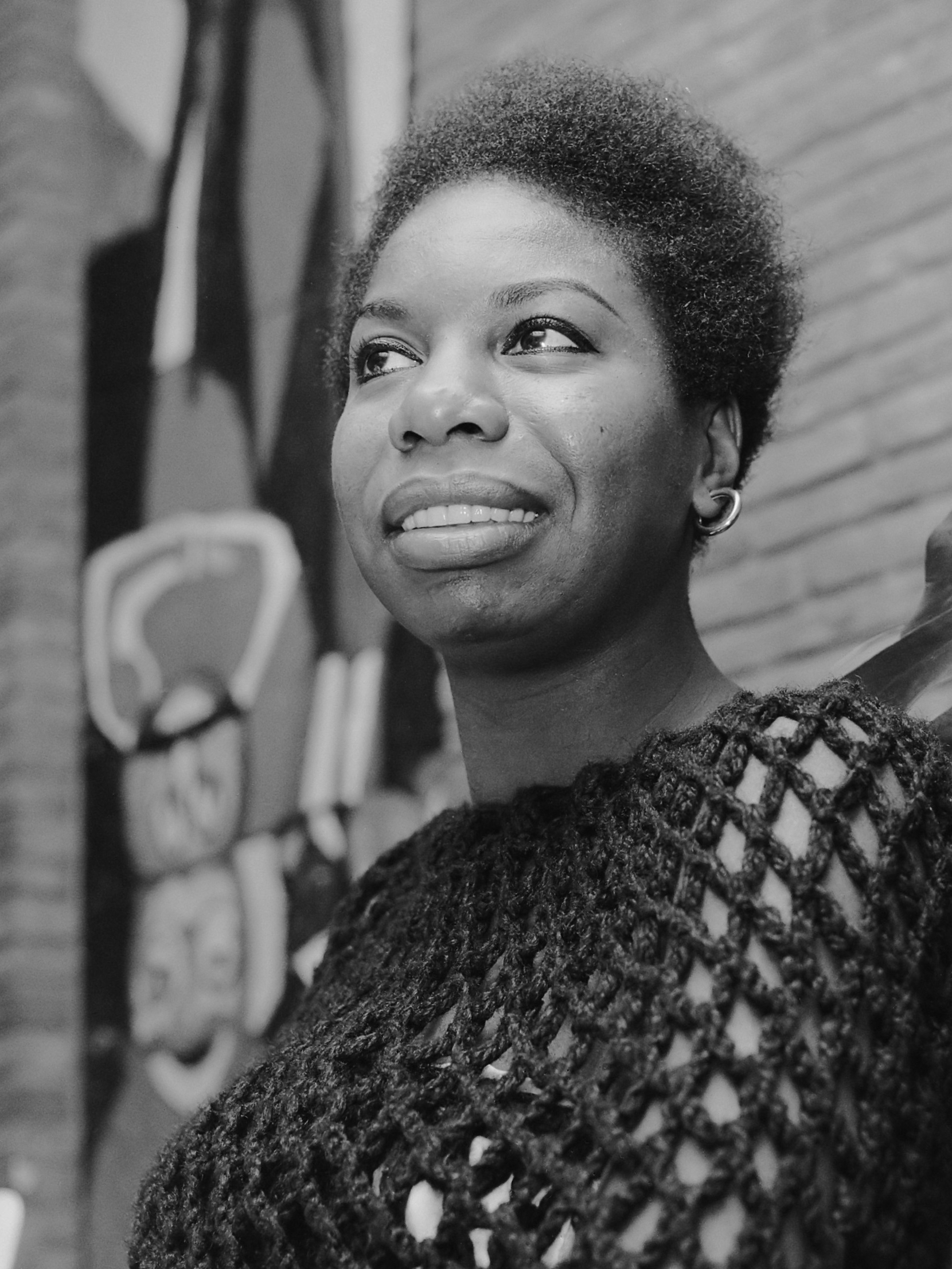
Ledisi's major influences include Dinah Washington (left) and Nina Simone (right).

Ledisi names Nina Simone as her major musical influence. Ledisi recalled going through a depression and divorce during her late twenties. She even contemplated suicide until hearing Simone's cover of "Trouble in Mind" on the radio, leading Ledisi to repudiate her thoughts of suicide and revived her career. In July 2021, she released a tribute album titled Ledisi Sings Nina, which features popular songs written or covered by Simone. She also credits Dinah Washington as a major inspiration, stating that Washington gave her permission to move freely, create freely, be a woman in leadership. Ledisi also recorded a tribute album titled For Dinah (2025). Ledisi was also heavily influenced by Curtis Mayfield. On February 7, 2020, Ledisi paid homage to Mayfield doing a tribute concert alongside Bilal and the WDR Big Band.

Her musical influences also include Chaka Khan, Patti LaBelle, Deniece Williams, Leontyne Price, Aretha Franklin, Patsy Cline, Sarah Vaughn, Ella Fitzgerald, and Stevie Wonder. Ledisi credited Diana Ross's performance as Dorothy Gale in The Wiz for giving her the "acting bug". In an interview with People magazine, Ledisi cited Prince as a musical influence and that he encouraged her to leave her record label.

== Personal life ==
=== Marriage ===
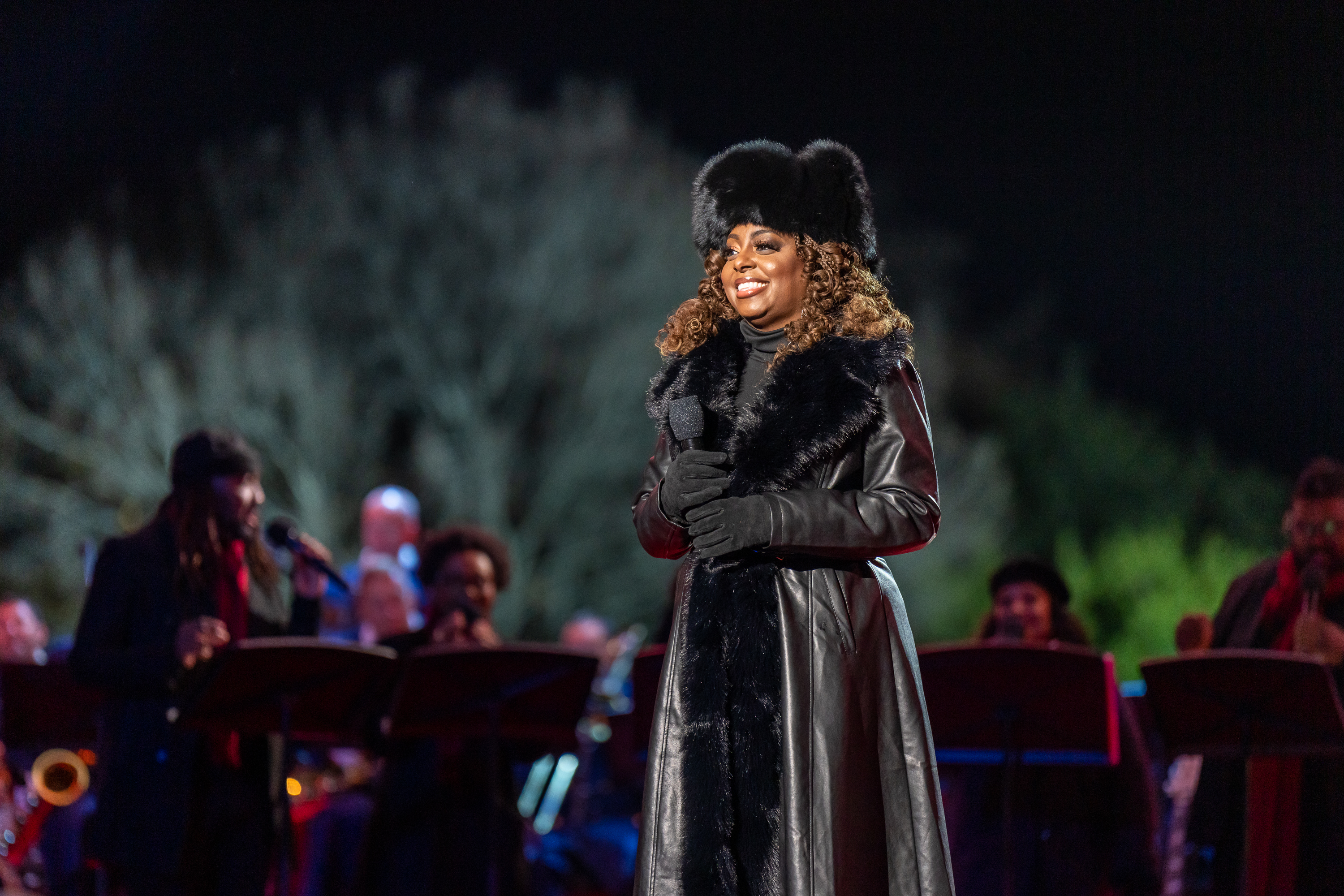
Ledisi performing at the National Christmas Tree Lighting Ceremony in Washington, D.C. in 2023

In the early 2000s, Ledisi was married to a man whose name was not publicly disclosed. They divorced in 2003. In 2018, she married director and actor Ronald T. Young. The couple appeared on the docu-series Black Love.

=== Politics ===
On November 6, 2011, Ledisi performed at the Obama 2012 Fundraiser. In March 2012, she was invited to the White House by First Lady Michelle Obama for the Women's History Month Mentoring Series. On September 4, 2012, Ledisi performed at the Democratic National Convention. She performed the gospel song "I Feel Like Goin' On" for the church service at St. John's Episcopal Church in Washington, D.C. on January 21, 2013, at President Barack Obama's 2013 presidential pre-inauguration. Her song "Raise Up" from her album Pieces of Me was included on President Obama's Campaign Playlist. On January 19, 2017, Ledisi posted a picture of Obama, thanking him for his presidential term. In June 2023, Ledisi was invited to perform during the Juneteenth Concert at the South Lawn.

=== Activism ===
I was fortunate enough to get a full five-year scholarship to the young musicians’ program at UC Berkeley. The love and support of my mother and the generosity of donors for youth musical programs led me to where I am today. But not all children will have these opportunities. That is why the Recording Academy, along with the California PTA, the Actors Fund and the Los Angeles Philharmonic, are joining hundreds of school superintendents, arts advocates, business leaders, teachers, parents and students in calling on the Legislature to pass and Gov. Jerry Brown to sign the Arts for Every Student Act.

— Ledisi

In September 2017, Ledisi headlined the Black AIDS Institute's Heroes Gala. In November 2017, Ledisi became an ambassador for the Black AIDS Institute. She stated, "I want to work with everybody that's involved that are dealing with AIDS and HIV and AIDS/HIV prevention, anything just to spread the word about that and stop all the stigmas. I'm hoping through my voice and my platform to educate people." She also met with the Black Treatment Advocates Network (BTAN) and the Detroit Health Department to express concern about the disparate number of African American women with HIV compared to other demographics.

In August 2018, Ledisi spoke out about the importance of music education. She stood in support of the Arts for Every Student Act. The legislation bill establishes an incentive grant program for school districts to expand access to visual and performing arts instruction, including music, dance, theatre, media arts and visual arts. She also emphasized herself as an example of the value of arts education, and called on both the public and lawmakers to support the bill. The legislation was signed by Senator Ben Allen.

In 2021, she was elected president of the Los Angeles Chapter. In 2022, Ledisi became a professor and first artist-in-residence at Berklee College of Music, starting at the academic year of 2022–2023. Under Berklee's Jazz and Gender Justice Program, she educated academic students and created workshops.

== Awards and achievements ==
Ledisi has earned an array of awards, honors, and nominations. These include a Grammy Award and two Soul Train Music Awards. She has been the honorary musical recipient of Americans for the Arts, EmpowHer, and Los Angeles Jazz Society. In December 2018, she was honored by the Black AIDS Institute for her work and advocacy. In August 2021, she became an honorary member of Delta Sigma Theta sorority. In May 2024, she received an honorary doctorate degree from the Berklee College of Music. In June 2025, Billboard ranked her at number 64 on The 75 Best R&B Artists of All Time.

== Business and ventures ==
=== LeSun Music and Listen Back Entertainment ===
In 1999, Ledisi co-founded the independent record label LeSun Music with musician Sundra Manning. The name is derived from the first names of Ledisi and Sundra. The record label distributed a total of three albums: Soulsinger (2000), Feeling Orange but Sometimes Blue, Ledisi and Anibade Live Recordings Vol. 1 (2003), and reissue edition titled Soulsinger: The Revival (2003). The label became defunct in 2006. In January 2019, Ledisi founded another independent record label called Listen Back Entertainment. The label's distributor is BMG Rights Management. The company has distributed Ledisi's albums including The Wild Card (2020), Ledisi Live at the Troubadour (2021), Ledisi Sings Nina (2021), Good Life (2024), The Crown (2025), and For Dinah (2025).

=== Production companies ===
In 2005, Ledisi founded a production company called Ledhead Productions. In September 2016, Ledisi started another production company called Fig Street Films. In 2019, the company produced Ledisi: The Legend of Little Girl Blue, a stage production about the lives of Ledisi and Nina Simone. On November 28, 2020, Fig Street Films produced a live concert special titled Ledisi Live: A Tribute to Nina Simone, which aired on American television network PBS. In 2019, Ledisi co-founded Chinwe'ya Publishing Company. The company published Ledisi's third book Don't Ever Lose Your Walk: How to Embrace Your Journey, which was released in January 2020.

== Discography ==
Studio albums

- Soulsinger (2000)
- Feeling Orange but Sometimes Blue (2002)
- Lost & Found (2007)
- It's Christmas (2008)
- Turn Me Loose (2009)
- Pieces of Me (2011)
- The Truth (2014)
- Let Love Rule (2017)
- The Wild Card (2020)
- Ledisi Sings Nina (2021)
- Good Life (2024)
- The Crown (2025)
- For Dinah (2025)

== Tours ==
Headlining tours

- Pieces of Me Tour (2011)
- B.G.T.Y. Tour (2012)
- The Truth Tour (2014)
- The Intimate Truth Tour (2015)
- Let Love Rule Tour (2018)
- Ledisi Live UK Tour (2019)
- Nina and Me Tour (2019)
- The Wild Card Tour (2021)
- Ledisi Sings Nina Tour (2021–2023)
- The Good Life Tour (2024)
- Love You Too Tour (2025)
- European Tour (2025)
- The Crown Tour (2025)
- Ledisi for Dinah Tour (2025–2026)

Co-headlining tours

- The Rebel, The Soul & The Saint Tour (2017; with Kirk Franklin)
- The Soul II Soul Tour (2023; with Kem)

Residencies

- Ledisi: The Legend of Little Girl Blue (2019)

Opening act

- Intimacy Tour (Kem) (2011)

== Filmography ==
=== Film ===
Year	Title	Role	Notes
2008	Leatherheads	Blues Singer	
2011	Leave It on the Floor	Princess' Mother	
2014	Selma	Mahalia Jackson	
2016	The Tale of Four	Aunt Sara	Short film
2021	Twice Bitten	Jessica	
2021	B-Boy Blues	Ann Walker	
2022	Remember Me: The Mahalia Jackson Story	Mahalia Jackson	
2022	All Saints Christmas	Lissette	Television film
2023	Spinning Gold	Gladys Knight	
2025	Juliet & Romeo	Vesante	

=== Television ===
Year	Title	Role	Notes
2020	American Soul	Patti LaBelle	Episode: "1975"
2021	Pose	Angela	Episode: "Take Me to Church"

== Theatre and musical ==
List of acting performances in theatre
Year	Title	Role	Notes	Source
1990	The Wiz	Dorothy	Lead role; Antioch Community Theater production	
1990–2001	Beach Blanket Babylon	Performer	Supporting role; National Tour	
2004	Caroline, or Change	The Washing Machine, The Radio	Supporting role; Broadway	
2004	Hair	Performer	Supporting role; Broadway	
2008	Once on This Island	Asaka	Supporting role; Reprise Theatre Company	
2019	Witness Uganda	Rain Lady, Ancestor	Supporting role; Off-Broadway	
2022	The Life	Sonja	Supporting role; Off-Broadway	
2026	Ain't Misbehavin'	Performer	Main role; Ebony Repertory Theatre	
2026	Wanted: The Legend of the Sisters Clarke	Tallulah Clarke	Main role; Broadway	

== Published works ==
- Better Than Alright: Finding Peace, Love & Power (2012)
- The Walk: Accepting Your Life As It Is Now (2018)
- Don't Ever Lose Your Walk: How to Embrace Your Journey (2020)
