= Ledisi Sings Nina =

Studio album by Ledisi
- Released: July 23, 2021
- Recorded: 2019–2021
- Studio: Esplanade Studios (New Orleans); Stagg Street Studio (Van Nuys); Studio 3 Muziekcentrum van de Omroep (Hilversum); Word of Mouth Studio, (New Orleans)
- Genre: Jazz, traditional pop
- Length: 30:48
- Label: Listen Back Entertainment
- Producer: Ledisi; Jules Buckley; Gregg Field; Rex Rideout; Adonis Rose

Ledisi chronology
| Ledisi Live at The Troubadour (2021) | Ledisi Sings Nina (2021) | Good Life (2024) |

Singles from Ledisi Sings Nina
- 1. "Feeling Good" Released: July 9, 2021

Ledisi Sings Nina is the tenth studio album by American singer Ledisi. The album was released on July 23, 2021, by her record label Listen Back Entertainment and distributed by BMG Rights Management. The album was recorded in collaboration with the Metropole Orkest. Ledisi Sings Nina is a tribute album to American singer-songwriter and civil rights activist Nina Simone. The album was nominated for Outstanding Jazz Vocal Album at the 53rd NAACP Image Awards and a Grammy Award for Best Traditional Pop Vocal Album at the 64th Annual Grammy Awards.

== Background ==
In 2003, Ledisi recounted first listening to Nina Simone. After the release of her second album Feeling Orange but Sometimes Blue in 2002, she reached a stagnation in her music career.

I was on my rocking chair on my porch in East Oakland, and I was depressed. This was after I recorded two albums, but I had bills, just got divorced, hated the area, and felt like I was not growing. So I decided, 'OK. This is the day. I’m going to leave this earth.' [After hearing Nina Simone's "Trouble in Mind"] It jumped me out of my skin.

— Ledisi on Nina Simone

After hearing Nina Simone's cover version of "Trouble in Mind" on the radio, Ledisi repudiated her thoughts of suicide and revived her career. In 2006, she secured a record deal with major label Verve Forecast Records and went on to release a total of seven albums during her duration on the label. In 2006, Ledisi starred as Aunt Sara in The Tale of Four; a short film inspired by the song Four Women by Nina Simone. In 2017, she incorporated songs from Simone's repertoire into her concert with the National Symphony Orchestra (NSO Pops) at the Kennedy Center. In 2018, she headlined a tribute concert to Simone in New Orleans with the drummer Adonis Rose and the New Orleans Jazz Orchestra.

== Recording ==
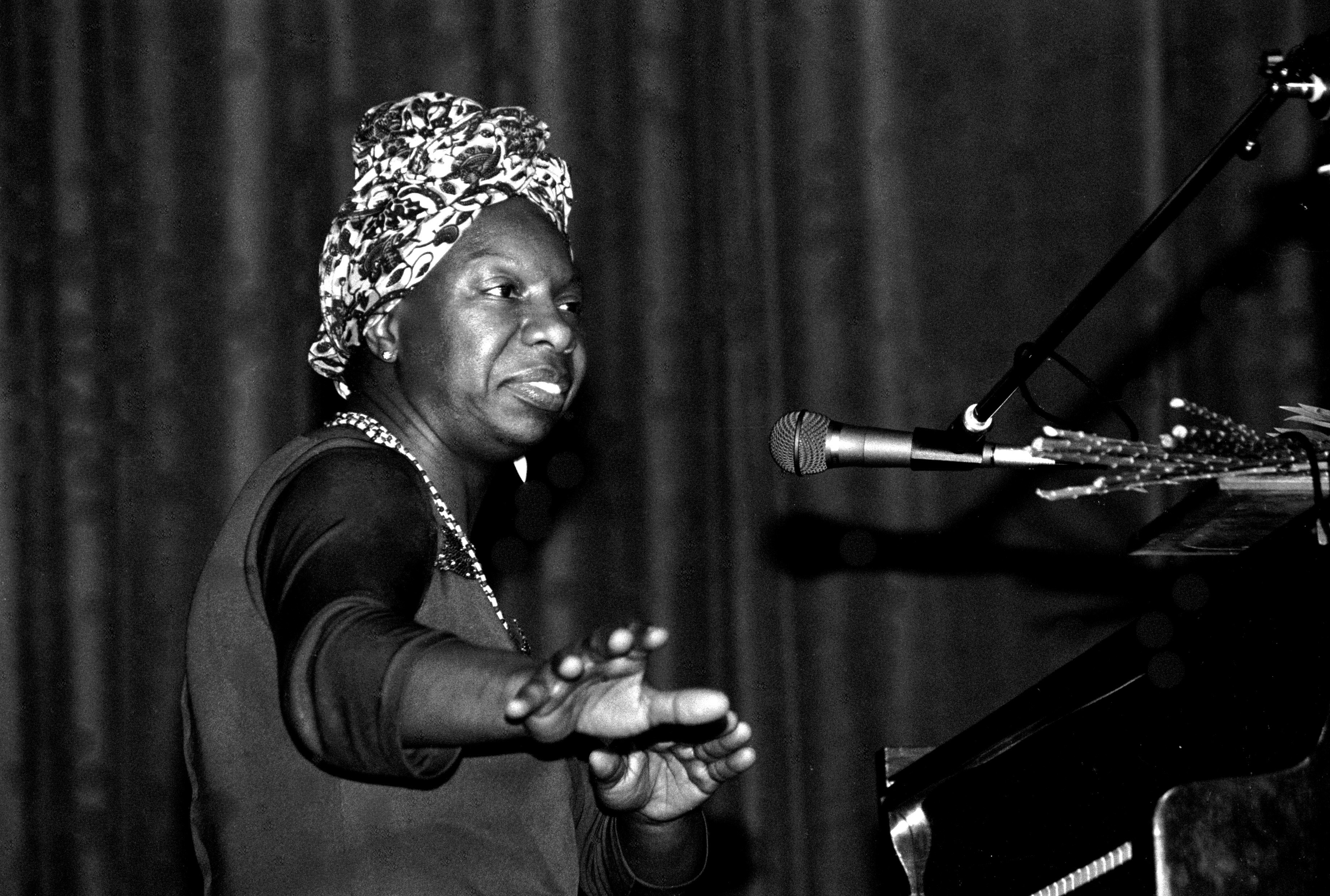
The album was inspired by Nina Simone.

In 2021, Ledisi began recording the album. Live recordings from her 2019 performance with the Metropole Orkest at the Royal Albert Hall in London were also used for the album. Ledisi enlisted in the aid of Jules Buckley, who conducted the Metropole Orkest for five songs. The Metropole Orkest were credited as featured performers on "Feeling Good", "My Baby Just Cares for Me", "Ne Me Quitte Pas (Don't Leave Me)", "Work Song", and "Four Women". The cover version of "Four Women" features American singers Lizz Wright, Alice Smith, and Lisa Fischer, the latter of whom performed the song with Ledisi during their performance at The Royal Albert Hall in London.

== Release and promotion ==
On November 28, 2020, American television network PBS aired Ledisi Live: A Tribute to Nina Simone. The concert was recorded at the Smith Center for the Performing Arts in Las Vegas. A cover version of Nina Simone's interpretation of "Feeling Good" was released as a single on July 9, 2021.

On July 17, 2021, Ledisi held a virtual listening party for the album. In collaboration with BMG Rights Management, Ledisi Sings Nina released by Listen Back Entertainment on July 23, 2021. Shortly after the release of the album, PBS began airing reruns of the concert special Ledisi Live: A Tribute to Nina Simone. On April 4, 2022, she performed "Ne Me Quitte Pas (Don't Leave Me)" at the premiere ceremony to the 64th Annual Grammy Awards. On April 15, 2022, the album was released on vinyl.

== Tour ==
In 2019, Ledisi headlined the Nina and Me Tour. The tour ran from May 10, 2019, to October 18, 2019. During her concert performances at Powell Symphony Hall in St. Louis, Missouri, she was joined by the New Orleans Jazz Orchestra. She was joined by the Metropole Orkest for the performances at Royal Albert Hall in London and The Royal Concertgebouw in Amsterdam. After the release of Ledisi Sings Nina, Ledisi embarked on the Ledisi Sings Nina Tour, which featured spot dates from July 2021 to late 2023.

== Commercial performance ==
Ledisi Sings Nina debuted at number two on Billboard's Classical Crossover Albums chart, spending a total of fifteen weeks on the chart. The album spent one week on the US Classical Albums chart, peaking at number twelve. It peaked at number thirteen on the Jazz Albums chart, while peaking at number eleven on the Billboard's Traditional Jazz Albums chart.

== Critical reception ==
Professional ratings
Review scores
| Source | Rating |
|---|---|
| AllMusic | 4/5 stars |

Andy Kellman of AllMusic felt Ledisi Sings Nina was "most appealing because that Ledisi is herself at all times, empowered by Simone yet utterly distinct." Kellman also considered the album as "crucial to Ledisi's discography as any of her [past] four Grammy-nominated albums." He also selected "Feeling Good", "Four Women", and "I'm Going Back Home" as the album's highlights and standout songs. Salamishah Tillet of The New York Times felt the album "showcase both the diversity and depth of Simone’s musicianship and the breathtaking range and reach of Ledisi’s own voice. LZ Granderson of The Los Angeles Times remarked that "although some of the lyrics were penned more than half a century ago, Ledisi molds them with contemporary hands, creating a stunning piece of art. It is a thank-you to the voice that led to her salvation. It is a note of encouragement for those who may find themselves in a dark space. It is a prayer for fewer dark spaces for us all."

== Accolades ==
Awards and nominations for Ledisi Sings Nina
| Year | Award | Category | Nominee(s) | Result | Ref. |
|---|---|---|---|---|---|
| 2022 | Grammy Award | Best Traditional Pop Vocal Album | Ledisi Sings Nina | Nominated | |
| 2022 | NAACP Image Award | Outstanding Jazz Vocal Album | Ledisi Sings Nina | Nominated | |

=== Listings ===
Listings for Ledisi Sings Nina
| Year | Publication | List | Ref. |
|---|---|---|---|
| 2021 | All Music | Favorite Jazz (and Beyond) Albums | |

== Track listing ==
| No. | Title | Writer(s) | Length |
|---|---|---|---|
| 1. | "Feeling Good" (featuring Metropole Orkest) | Leslie Bricusse; Anthony Newley | 3:53 |
| 2. | "My Baby Just Cares for Me" (featuring Metropole Orkest) | Walter Donaldson; Gus Kahn | 3:39 |
| 3. | "Ne Me Quitte Pas (Don't Leave Me)" (featuring Metropole Orkest) | Jacques Brel | 5:11 |
| 4. | "Wild Is the Wind (Live)" | Dimitri Tiomkin; Ned Washington | 3:36 |
| 5. | "Work Song" (featuring Metropole Orkest) | Nat Adderley; Oscar Brown | 6:20 |
| 6. | "Four Women" (featuring Lisa Fischer, Alice Smith, Lizz Wright, Metropole Orkest) | Nina Simone | 4:49 |
| 7. | "I'm Going Back Home" | Rudy Stevenson | 3:20 |

== Charts ==
| Chart (2021) | Peak position |
|---|---|
| US Classical Albums (Billboard) | 12 |
| US Classical Crossover Albums (Billboard) | 2 |
| US Jazz Albums (Billboard) | 13 |
| US Traditional Jazz Albums (Billboard) | 11 |
