= The Wild Card =

Studio album by Ledisi
- Released: August 28, 2020
- Recorded: 2019–2020
- Genre: R&B
- Length: 57:46
- Label: Listen Back Entertainment
- Producers: Ledisi; Kal Banx; Ivan Barias; Phil Beaudreau; Jeff Gitelman; Robert Glasper; Cory Henry; Rex Rideout; SiR

Ledisi chronology
| Let Love Rule (2017) | The Wild Card (2020) | Ledisi Live at The Troubadour (2021) |

Singles from The Wild Card
- 1. "Anything for You" Released: April 3, 2020; 2. "Wake Up" Released: August 24, 2020; 3. "Same Love" Released: February 4, 2021

The Wild Card is the ninth studio album by American singer and songwriter Ledisi. It was released on August 28, 2020, by Listen Back Entertainment, and distributed by BMG Rights Management. Her first independent album since Feeling Orange but Sometimes Blue (2002) and the first project release on Listen Back Entertainment, Ledisi wrote and produced the album with Kal Banx, Ivan Barias, Phil Beaudreau, Jeff Gitelman, Robert Glasper, Cory Henry, Rex Rideout, SiR and various other collaborators. Sa-Roc and Cory Henry also appear as featured musicians.

The album debuted at number 79 on the US Top Album Sales chart. The lead single "Anything for You" was released on April 3, 2020, and reached number one on Billboard's Adult R&B Songs chart for two weeks, making it Ledisi's first song to top that chart.

"Anything for You" won a Grammy Award for Best Traditional R&B Performance at the 63rd Annual Grammy Awards in 2021, marking her first Grammy Award win. In promotion of the album, Ledisi embarked on The Wild Card Tour, and released an accompanying live album.

== Background and conception ==
I wanted some gutbucket music that reminds me of being in a juke joint where you have the pool table and lawn chairs with some brown liquor.

— Ledisi on The Wild Card

In January 2019, Ledisi departed from Verve Records and founded her own label Listen Back Entertainment. She began recording the album in 2019. When the COVID-19 pandemic struck in March 2020, Ledisi had recorded most of the album except two songs; one of them being a cover version of "Without You" by Badfinger. Due to social distancing, Ledisi created her own home studio where she recorded and engineered the remaining songs.

== Release and promotion ==
In early 2020, Ledisi announced the new album through entertainment magazines Billboard and Rolling Stone. She also posted a picture imitating the mugshot of civil rights figures Martin Luther King Jr. and Rosa Parks, where she replaced her mugshot number with the album's release date "0828". The album was released on August 28, 2020, which coincided with the date of King's "I Have a Dream" speech in 1963 as well as the Slavery Abolition Act 1833 receiving royal assent in the United Kingdom.

On the day of the album's release, Ledisi held a livestream listening party via YouTube and Facebook, hosted by American radio personality Cayman Kelly. On September 2, 2020, she appeared on Good Morning America and performed "Stone". In November 2020, Ledisi appeared on the Kelly Clarkson Show to promote her album and also performed "Anything for You".

=== Singles ===
"Anything for You" was released as the lead single on April 3, 2020. The song was inspired by the death of her long-time music producer Rex Rideout's father. The song peaked atop the US Billboard Adult R&B Songs chart for two weeks, making it her first number-one song on the chart. On July 31, 2020, a duet version with PJ Morton was released.

"Wake Up", which features American rapper Sa-Roc, was released as the second single on August 24, 2020. In February 2021, "Same Love" was released as the third single. The song peaked at number twenty-two on the Adult R&B Songs chart.

== Tour ==
During the COVID-19 pandemic, Ledisi was unable to tour in the latter part of 2020. On September 12, 2020, she gave on a free virtual concert titled This One's for You: A Night of Ledisi Live. The concert was recorded at the Troubadour in West Hollywood, California and released as a live album titled Ledisi Live at The Troubadour on April 30, 2021. On June 18, 2021, Ledisi announced the Wild Card Tour via her Facebook account. The concert run began on October 13, 2021, at Paramount Theatre in Austin, Texas. The tour concluded on November 18, 2021, at Carolina Theatre in Durham, North Carolina.

== Critical reception ==
Professional ratings
Review scores
| Source | Rating |
|---|---|
| AllMusic | 4/5 stars |

Andy Kellman, writing for AllMusic, wrote that Ledisi "and her supporting musicians still incorporate shades of bygone eras with natural grace. Even the overtly retro moments retain a freshness, and whenever a song bears some obvious likeness, Ledisi's entrancing and singular voice – bolstered by some subtly dazzling harmonies and arrangements – is at the fore to distinguish it. A spirit of unrestrained individualism powers some of the best material."

== Track listing ==
| No. | Title | Writer(s) | Length |
|---|---|---|---|
| 1. | "Anything for You" | Ledisi, Rex Rideout, Jarius "J-Mo" Mozee | 4:17 |
| 2. | "Next Time" | Deva Mahal | 5:08 |
| 3. | "Same Love" | Ledisi, Jeff "Gitty" Gitelman, Kal Banks, Inglewood Sir | 4:34 |
| 4. | "Now or Never" | Robert Glasper, Muhammed Ahmad Ayers | 5:27 |
| 5. | "Stay Gone" | Ledisi, Rideout, Darrell Cooks, Sara Williams | 3:37 |
| 6. | "Where I Am" | Ledisi, Kristal Oliver, Ivan Barias | 3:05 |
| 7. | "WKND" | Ledisi, Rideout, Oliver, Mozee, Ethan Farmer, Marcus Kincy, Brian Collier | 5:00 |
| 8. | "What Kinda Love Is That" (featuring Cory Henry) | Ledisi, Rideout, Oliver, Mozee, Farmer, Kincy, Collier | 4:05 |
| 9. | "Sunrise Interlude" | Cory Henry | 0:39 |
| 10. | "In It to Win" | Ledisi, Phil Beaudreau | 4:07 |
| 11. | "One" | Ledisi, Rideout, Mozee | 4:06 |
| 12. | "Wake Up" (featuring Sa-Roc) | Glasper, Ledisi, Assata Perkins, Williams | 5:04 |
| 13. | "Stone" | Mahal | 4:11 |
| 14. | "Without You" | Pete Ham, Tom Evans | 3:50 |
| 15. | "Sunset Interlude" | Henry | 0:36 |

== Charts ==
| Chart (2020) | Peak position |
|---|---|
| US Current Album Sales (Billboard) | 79 |

== Release history ==
| Region | Date | Format(s) | Label | Ref. |
|---|---|---|---|---|
| Various | August 28, 2020 | CD; digital download; streaming; vinyl | Listen Back | |
