= Suzi Dietz =

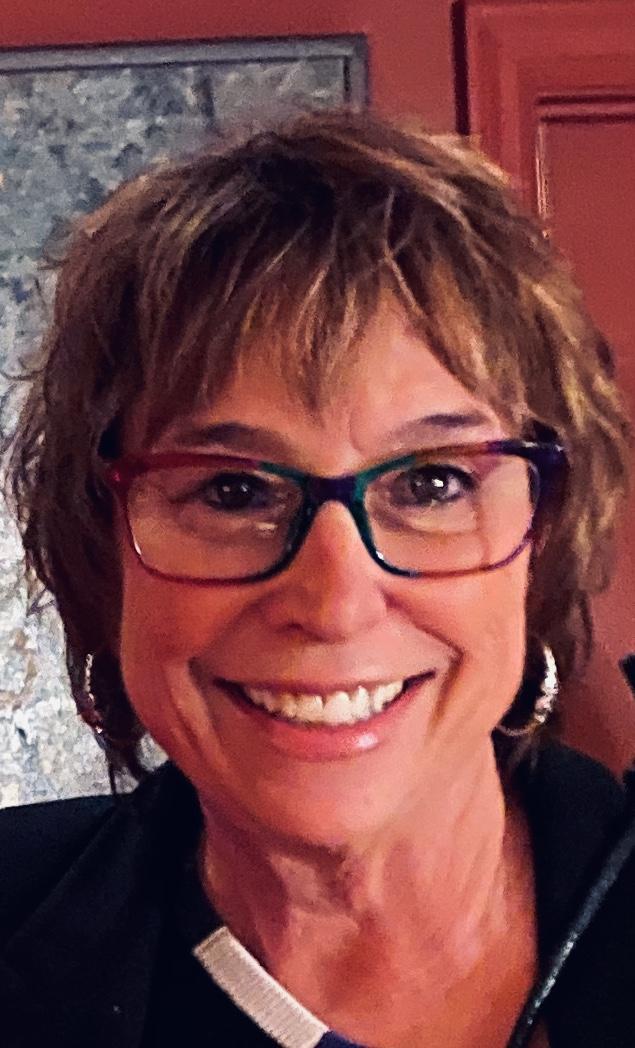
- Born: Susan Dietz; 1947 (age 78–79); Philadelphia, PA
- Education: University of Pennsylvania; Cornell University
- Occupations: Theater producer and director
- Years active: 1979–present
- Spouse: Lenny Beer (m. 1974)
- Awards: Drama-Logue Lifetime Achievement Award (1984); Tony Award nominations (1999, 2002, 2007, 2010, 2014)

Susan (Suzi) Dietz is an American theater producer and director. A five-time Tony nominee, and the winner of a Drama-Logue Lifetime Achievement Award for outstanding contributions to Los Angeles theater, she was the artistic director of the LA Stage Company, the producing artistic director for the Pasadena Playhouse, and the executive director of the Canon Theater in Beverly Hills. Her Broadway credits include Topdog/Underdog by Suzan-Lori Parks, The Little Dog Laughed by Douglas Carter Beane, Fela! by Bill T. Jones and Jim Lewis and Terrence McNally's Mothers and Sons.

== Early life and education ==
Dietz was born to Sylvia and Simon Dietz and grew up in Bala Cynwyd. Her father owned a well-known hat store on South Street in Philadelphia. As a student at Lower Merion High School, she was a "theater junkie"—in addition to singing, acting and seeing Broadway tryouts as soon as they came to Philadelphia, she frequently attended performances at Philadelphia's Theater of the Living Arts. There, she saw Harry Noon and Night, by Ronald Ribman, who would later be the subject of her doctoral thesis.

Dietz went to Cornell University and received a BA in English in 1969. She attended graduate school at the University of Pennsylvania, and earned a PhD in English in 1974. Following her graduation, she moved to New York to teach.

== Career ==
=== LA Stage Company, Pasadena Playhouse, Canon Theater ===
Finding New York difficult—she said she was "one of those people whom New York defeated"—Dietz moved to Los Angeles with her husband, Lenny Beer, whom she met in 1971. In Los Angeles, she taught at the Harvard School for Boys, which later became the Harvard-Westlake School, where she founded the drama department.

Although she recorded a single, "Waited Much Too Long," released on Capitol in 1974, Dietz lost interest in performing before she moved to Los Angeles and shifted her focus to directing. She directed her first show in professional theater by "doing it herself"—she raised money through family and friends and produced and directed the West Coast premiere of Wendy Wasserstein's Uncommon Women and Others at the Callboard Theater in West Hollywood. In 1981, the show moved to the LA Stage Company, a non-profit Dietz created at the Las Palmas Theater in Hollywood. A succession of hit productions followed, including Nuts and the world premiere of Penn & Teller. During the same time period—by then an "up-and-coming stage entrepreneur"—Dietz established LA Stage Company West at the former Solari Theater. Among other productions, as the artistic director for both theaters, she produced the West Coast premieres of Sister Mary Ignatius Explains It All For You by Christopher Durang, Cloud 9 by Caryl Churchill, Wasserstein's Isn’t it Romantic and Stephen Banks' Home Entertainment Center, which was filmed for Showtine in 1991. In 1984, Dietz revived the theatre's original name, the Canon Theater. By the end of the 1980s, the Canon was known as a "place where shows -- seldom of the serious persuasion -- could sprout their commercial wings."

In November 1986, Dietz and Steven Rothman were named co-producing artistic directors of the Pasadena Playhouse, reviving the theater, which had been defunct for 12 years. In 1987,Los Angeles Daily News wrote that Dietz and Rothman had helped to establish Pasadena, a suburb of Los Angeles, as a center for the arts. The ’88-89 season won three Los Angeles Drama Critics Circle awards and 32 Drama-Logue awards. However, Dietz and Rothman had differing artistic visions. Rothman resigned, and Dietz -- still producing shows at the Canon -- became the theater's sole artistic producing director. Among others, the Pasadena Playhouse presented the world premiere of Mail, the world premiere of Accomplice, Carnal Knowledge, Steel Magnolias and Stepping Out during Dietz' tenure. In 1988, Dietz brought Mail to the Music Box Theater in New York. It was her first credit as a producer on Broadway.

Dietz ran the Canon Theater for 21 years, producing well-received and well-attended shows including Love Letters, with a revolving cast that featured Charlton Heston, Whoopi Goldberg, Sharon Stone, Matthew Broderick, Helen Hunt, and others, which ran for two years; Dick Shawn's The Second Greatest Entertainer in the World, two separate runs of Forever Plaid, Lynn Redgrave's Shakespeare for My Father, Eve Ensler's Vagina Monologues, Andrea Martin's one woman show Nude Nude Totally Nude. and Lorna Luft's Songs My Mother Taught Me. She continued to work on productions at other venues throughout the time she ran the Canon, most notably the West Coast premiere of Hedwig and the Angry Inch at the Henry Fonda Theater.

Dietz took a self-imposed break from theater between 1990 and 1996, during which she created MultiTalent, a management company. She described the time period as a "theater detox," and, at her husband's urging, went back to the theater in 1999.

=== Broadway, Terrence McNally, Billy Porter ===
In 1999, Dietz returned to Broadway to produce The Lonesome West, the third play in Martin McDonagh's Leenane trilogy, at the Lyceum Theater. The production was nominated for four Tony Awards, including the Best Play, earning Dietz her first nomination for a Tony. The next play she produced on Broadway, Top Dog/Underdog, premiered at the Ambassador Theatre the same week it won the Pulitzer Prize for drama. It was nominated for Best Play at the 2002 Tony Awards, bringing Dietz her second Tony nomination. In early 2006, in association with Roy Gabay and the Second Stage Theater, Dietz produced the off-Broadway debut of The Little Dog Laughed, a gay Hollywood satire. It opened on Broadway in October to positive reviews, and closed in February 2007 after 22 previews and 112 performances. Dietz was nominated for a Tony Award for her role as a producer of the show.

In 2005, with Peter Schneider, Dietz commissioned Terrence McNally to write Some Men, a play based on Cafe Verboten, a collection of music from artists including Bricktop, the Bee Gees, Judy Garland and Barbra Streisand, "the soundtrack of the gay movement of the 20th Century." Dietz developed the play at Sundance's White Oak winter workshop. In a 2011 interview, she said: "...the big idea of the play is that through all the years and the fight for rights and dignity, the gay community was really looking for a way to connect with each other and form permanent relationships. So Some Men became a play, with music, about gay life in the 20th century as seen through the prism of marriage and commitment." The play debuted at the Philadelphia Theatre Company in 2006, and subsequently ran in New York, Vancouver, and San Francisco. In 2009 she produced a reading of Some Men in Los Angeles to raise money for the Courage Campaign. Dietz also produced the McNally plays Deuce, It's Only a Play, and Mothers and Sons, for which she received her fifth Tony nomination. She also executive produced the feature-length documentary, Terrence McNally: Every Act of Life. The film, which premiered at the Tribeca Film Festival in 2018, was shown at more than 50 film festivals, and aired as part of the PBS series American Masters.

Dietz and Beer met Billy Porter at the midpoint of his career. Then struggling, he said in a 2013 interview that they kept him "afloat for a very long time." In 2007, Dietz—who Porter would later describe as his mentor—worked with Porter to develop and produce Being Alive. A musical that mixed Stephen Sondheim, Shakespeare and the African American musical vernacular, it premiered at the Westport Country Playhouse before moving to the Philadelphia Theater Co. Dietz also produced Porter's autobiographical play, While I Yet Live, and executive produced his album Billy Porter Presents The Soul of Richard Rodgers. He directed Ham: A Musical Memoir, based on Sam Harris’ book HAM: Slices of a Life, which Dietz produced. It premiered off-Broadway at Theater 511 at Ars Nova in January 2015, and had its West Coast debut at the Los Angeles LGBT Center, where it was named Best New Musical by the Los Angeles Drama Critics Circle. From 2008 until 2010, with Jason Alexander as the artistic director, she served as the producing director of the Reprise Theater Company.

In 2019, in addition to other projects, Dietz produced Anne: A New Play, a theatrical adaptation of Anne Frank's Diary that examined what would have happened if Frank had lived. It premiered at the Simon Wiesenthal Center at Museum of Tolerance, where a companion exhibit featuring artifacts, photos and documents from Frank’s life was displayed. She also produced The Investigation: A Search for the Truth in Ten Parts—a reading of excerpts from the Mueller Report—starring Annette Bening, John Lithgow, and Kevin Kline which took place at the Riverside Church in New York. Later that year she produced the LA version at the Saban Theater. The show, titled You Can't Make This Shit Up it featured Larry David, Billy Porter, Sharon Osbourne and Debra Messing (as Donald Trump). It was staged at the Saban Theater in October 2019 as a fundraiser for Barbara Boxer's PAC for a Change.

For 19 years, Dietz produced A Night at Sardi's, a benefit concert that raised more than $20 million for the Los Angeles Alzheimer's Association. In 2010, she received the organization's Humanitarian Award.

== Personal life and activism ==
Dietz is a longtime Democratic activist. She and Beer, a record business executive, were married in 1974. They have two children and five grandchildren.

== Selected credits ==
=== Broadway ===
- Honeymoon in Vegas (2015)
- It's Only a Play (2014)
- Mothers and Sons (2014)
- Fela! (2009, 2012)
- Deuce (2007)
- The Little Dog Laughed (2006)
- Steel Magnolias (2005)
- Ma Rainey's Black Bottom (2003)
- Topdog / Underdog (2002)
- The Lonesome West (1999)
- Mail (1988)

=== Off Broadway ===
- The Baby Dance (1991)
- Afterbirth: Kathy and Mo's Greatest Hits (2004)
- Some Men (2007)
- Adrift in Macau (2007)
- HAM: A Musical Memoir (2015)

=== Film and television ===
- Steven Banks: Home Entertainment Center (1991)
- All Over the Guy (2001)
- HAM: A Musical Memoir (2018)
- Call Waiting(2005)
- Every Act of Life 2019

== Awards and nominations ==
Year	Work	Award	Category	Result
1984	Contribution to Los Angeles Theater	Drama-Logue	Lifetime Achievement Award	Won
1999	The Lonesome West	Tony Award	Best play (as producer)	Nominated
2002	Top Dog/Underdog	Tony Award	Best play (as producer)	Nominated
2003	Songs My Mother Taught Me	LA Drama Critics Award	Best New Musical (as producer)	Won
2007	The Little Dog Laughed	Tony Award	Best play (as producer)	Nominated
2010	Humanitarian Award	Alzheimer's Association		Won
2010	Fela!	Tony Award	Best play (as producer)	Nominated
2014	Mothers and Sons	Tony Award	Best play (as producer)	Nominated
2015	HAM: A Musical Memoir	LA Drama Critics	Best New Musical (as producer)	Won
