= Lenny Beer =

American media executive and artist manager

- Born: Leonard J. Beer
- Education: Carnegie Mellon University; New York University
- Occupations: Editor-in-chief, HITS Magazine
- Years active: 1973 to present
- Spouse: Susan (Suzi) Dietz
- Children: Two
- Website: hitsdailydouble.com

Lenny Beer is an American media executive and artist manager. He is the co-founder and editor-in-chief of HITS Magazine, a co-founder and principal of the MGMT Company, and a theater producer and investor.

== Early life and education ==
Beer was born in the Bronx. His father, Morton, was a wholesale textiler and his mother Gloria a homemaker. He grew up in the New York City suburbs of Kew Gardens, New Hyde Park and Great Neck. He graduated from Carnegie Mellon University with a BA in business in 1971, and was awarded an MBA from New York University in 1973.

== Career ==
Beer worked briefly in a marketing capacity for Clairol after receiving his MBA. In 1973, he was hired as the chart editor at Record World. Like Billboard and Cashbox at the time, Record World based its charts on subjective data; Beer designed and implemented a system based on market research and piece counts, and created a transparent set of rules and procedures that determined how albums and singles were ranked. He was promoted to vice president at Record World before leaving in 1978 to accept a position as vice president of promotion at 20th Century Fox Records.

In late 1978, Beer partnered with Dennis Lavinthal, also a record executive, to form MusicVision, an independent promotion and marketing company. Shortly after the company was founded, Beer and Lavinthal were retained to promote a slate of Warner Bros. Records albums, including Prince's self titled album, which was his first platinum record, and Van Halen II, the best-selling of all of Van Halen's 12 studio albums. They had similar success with later projects, including the promotional campaign at Top 40 radio for Bruce Springsteen's "Dancing in the Dark", which became the biggest hit of Springsteen's career. They worked directly for Michael Jackson and Prince, and together managed Steely Dan founder Donald Fagen when his 1982 album, The Nightfly was released. The album, Fagen's first solo release, was nominated for seven Grammy Awards, including Album of the Year.

Beer co-founded the music industry trade magazine Hits in August 1986 as an irreverent alternative to Billboard. In a 1990 interview with the Los Angeles Times Beer said: "Billboard is dry. Radio & Records is very dry. They have terrific statistics and have good hard news. But we all got in the entertainment business because it was fun. And we're the only magazine that conveys the fun factor." The magazine quickly found its niche, and although unavailable on newsstands, it grossed more than $10 million annually in the 1990s. "Equally hilarious and insulting to all willing to read it," Hits became the industry's most successful trade magazine. Beer has served as editor-in-chief of Hits since its inception.

He co-founded The MGMT Company with Lavinthal in 2008. Among other artists, they manage the Grammy Award-winning bands Pentatonix and A Great Big World, The Airborne Toxic Event and Eagles of Death Metal.

Beer invests in and produces theater productions. He was a producer of Suzan-Lori Parks' Topdog/Underdog, which won the Pulitzer Prize for Drama (2002) and received a Tony nomination for Best Play. He also served as a producer on the 2015 Broadway musical based on the 1992 film Honeymoon in Vegas.

From 2003 until 2016, Beer was an instructor for the UCLA Extension course, The Music Business Now: How It Really Works. He has been a guest speaker at USC and the Clive Davis Institute of Recorded Music at NYU and served as a member of the Grammy screening committee for six years. "Widely considered one of the most knowledgeable people in the music industry," he frequently provides commentary for publications including the New York Times. He was featured in a Frontline documentary on PBS titled The Way the Music Died.

== Personal life ==
Beer and his wife, Susan (Suzi) Dietz, live in Sherman Oaks, California. They have two children, Jesse and Sofee. Dietz, a theater producer, has been nominated for five Tony awards.
