= Work Song (Nat Adderley song) =

Jazz standard by Nat Adderley

Song by Nat Adderley

from the album Work Song
- Released: 1960
- Recorded: January 25 & 27, 1960
- Genre: jazz
- Length: 4:15
- Label: Riverside
- Songwriters: Nat Adderley, Oscar Brown Jr

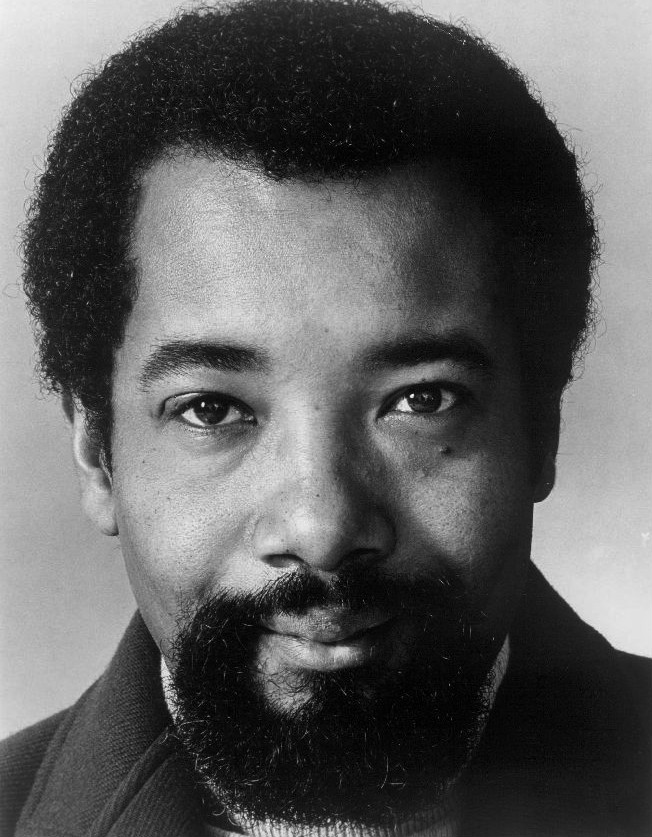
Nat Adderley in 1969.

"Work Song" is a work song and jazz standard by American trumpeter Nat Adderley and writer Oscar Brown Jr. It was first featured in Adderley's 1960 studio album of the same name, which was met with high praise and acclaim. "Work Song" is one of Adderley's best known compositions.

The song was originally only an instrumental, but Oscar Brown Jr. included lyrics in a cover released the following year on his album, Sin & Soul.

== Background ==
"Work Song" was inspired by Nat Adderley's childhood experience of seeing a group of convict laborers singing while they worked on a chain gang, paving the street in front of his family’s home in Florida.

== Musical composition ==
The song is a 16 bar form in F minor. It is a minor blues.

| F-7 | •/• (Note: This indicates to stay on the chord that came before. See: Grid notation) | •/• | •/• |
| F-7 | •/• | C7 | •/• |
| F-7 | •/• | •/• | •/• |
| F7 | Bb7 | Db7 C7 | F-7 |

The Penguin Guide to Jazz states: "'Work Song' is the real classic, of course, laced with a funky blues feel but marked by some unexpectedly lyrical playing." In a musical analysis of Adderley's improvisational bebop style, Kyle M. Granville writes that the song is "connected to the soul-jazz style that Nat Adderley and his brother Cannonball Adderley immersed themselves into during the mid-1960s."
