= BAM (magazine) =

American bi-weekly music magazine

Bay Area Music (BAM)
- Type: Music magazine
- Format: Free biweekly
- Owner: Bam Media
- Founder: Dennis Erokan
- Publisher: Earl Adkins (from 1994)
- Launched: January 1976; 50 years ago
- Ceased publication: June 1999
- Relaunched: 2011
- Circulation: 130,000 (mid-1980s)
- Sister newspapers: This Week; MicroTimes
- Website: bammagazine.com

BAM (short for Bay Area Music) was a free bi-weekly music magazine founded and published by Dennis Erokan in the San Francisco Bay Area from January 1976 until June 1999.

== History ==
Bay Area Music magazine was first published in January 1976. It was a free bi-weekly magazine that was funded by advertisers.

In the mid-1980s the magazine reached its largest circulation of 130,000 biweekly throughout California, after opening an office in Los Angeles. After the opening of the Los Angeles office, separate Northern and Southern editions of BAM were published.

In October 1994, the magazine got a new publisher, Earl Adkins. Adkins resigned in spring 1995. In 1995, Bam magazine's parent company, Bam Media, bought the copyright to the Seattle Rocket music magazine.

The final edition of the print magazine was published in June 1999. The paper's circulation at the time of closing was 55,000. The BAM logo was used as the music section of This Week, another Bam Media publication, after the paper folded.

=== Relaunch ===
In 2011, BAM returned as an online magazine at BAMmagazine.com, operated by Dennis Erokan.

== Bammies ==
In 1977, Erokan founded the Bay Area Music Awards, better known as the Bammies, a yearly award show for musicians in the San Francisco Bay Area. Winners were voted on by BAM's readers. In 1998, the Bammies name was changed to the California Music Awards. In March 2018, there was a Bammies Reunion Concert in San Francisco. The entire performance was filmed for a feature release.

== MicroTimes ==
MicroTimes was a free regional computer magazine, focused on industry personalities, founded and published by Dennis Erokan in the San Francisco Bay Area starting in 1984 and sold in 1999.
