= Feeling Orange but Sometimes Blue =

Studio album by Ledisi
- Released: 2002
- Recorded: 2001
- Studio: Laughing Tiger Studios (San Rafael, California); Blue Cherry Studios (San Jose, California); Spark (Emeryville, California); Coda Studios (Oakland, California); Gemini Studio (San Francisco, California); Infinite Studios (Alameda, California)
- Genre: Jazz; soul; blues
- Length: 51:29
- Label: LeSun Music
- Producer: Ledisi; Sundra Manning; Nelson Braxton; Wayne Braxton

Ledisi chronology
Soulsinger (2000)	Feeling Orange but Sometimes Blue (2002)	Lost & Found (2007)

Feeling Orange but Sometimes Blue is the second studio album by American singer-songwriter Ledisi. The album was released in 2002 on Ledisi's record label LeSun Music.

The album's musical style ranges from 1930s–1940s blues influences to contemporary jazz music. Live instrumentation was employed in recording of the entire album as part of Ledisi's vision of creating a jazz record using live instruments.

== Production and recording ==
In 2001, Ledisi began recording her second album. Unlike her previous album Soulsinger, Ledisi wrote and recorded original jazz songs. "Sugar / Brown Sugar" mixes interpretations of "Sugar" by Stanley Turrentine and "Brown Sugar" by D'Angelo. She also recorded jazz standards including "'Round Midnight", "In a Sentimental Mood", and "Autumn Leaves". She worked with American musician Pete Escovedo on the title-track "Feeling Orange but Sometimes Blue". According to album's liner notes, "If You Go" was dedicated to American singer Aaliyah who died in a plane crash in August 2001.

== Promotion ==
"Feeling Orange but Sometimes Blue" was released as the first single in June 2002. "Good Lovin'", from the album Soulsinger (2000), was released as the B-side song to "Feeling Orange but Sometimes Blue". On May 25, 2003, Ledisi and her band Anibade performed a twenty-minute set list at the California Music Awards.

== Accolades ==
Feeling Orange but Sometimes Blue won "Outstanding Jazz Album" at the California Music Awards on May 25, 2003. She was also nominated for "Outstanding Female Vocalist" and Feeling Orange but Sometimes Blue was also nominated for "Outstanding R&B Album" at the same ceremony.

== Track listing ==
No.	Title	Writer(s)	Producer(s)	Length
1.	"So Right"	Ledisi	Ledisi; Sundra Manning; Nelson Braxton	3:43
2.	"I've Got It"	Ledisi	Ledisi; Manning	3:33
3.	"Sugar / Brown Sugar"	Stanley Turrentine; Ali Shaheed Muhammad; D'Angelo	Ledisi; Manning	4:43
4.	"Meeting Marcus on a Thursday"	Ledisi	Ledisi; Manning	3:59
5.	"'Round Midnight"	Thelonious Monk; Bernie Hanighen; Cootie Williams	Ledisi; Manning	3:44
6.	"Straight No Chaser"	Ledisi; Sally Swisher; Monk	Ledisi; Manning	2:55
7.	"Feeling Orange but Sometimes Blue" (featuring Pete Escovedo)	Ledisi	Ledisi; Manning	7:43
8.	"In a Sentimental Mood"	Manny Kurtz	Ledisi; Manning; Nelson Braxton; Wayne Braxton	5:22
9.	"If You Go"	Ledisi	Ledisi; Manning	2:32
10.	"Autumn Leaves (Les feuilles mortes)"	Johnny Mercer; Jacques Prévert	Ledisi; Manning	4:37
11.	"Land of the Free"	Ledisi	Ledisi; Manning	5:33
12.	"Autumn Leaves" (Reprise)	Johnny Mercer; Jacques Prévert	Ledisi; Manning	2:56
Total length:				51:29

Sample credits

- "Sugar / Brown Sugar" contains an interpretation of "Sugar" by Stanley Turrentine and "Brown Sugar" by D'Angelo.

== Personnel ==
Credits are adapted from the liner notes of Feeling Orange but Sometimes Blue.

- Ledisi – all vocals, horn conductor (4)
- Sundra "Sun" Manning – acoustic piano (2, 7, 10, 11), Hammond B3 organ (3, 10), Fender Rhodes (5)
- Louis "Paisley" Hinton – acoustic piano (4)
- Mark Levine – acoustic piano (9)
- David James – slide guitar (2)
- Nelson Braxton – electric 6-string bass (1, 5, 8, 11), fretless bass (1), bass (3, 7, 10)
- Ron Belcher – acoustic upright bass (2, 6), upright bass (4)
- Tommy Bradford – drums (1, 8)
- Robert Rhodes Jr. – drums (2)
- Brian Collier – drums (3, 5, 7, 10, 11)
- Dezson Claborne – drums (4)
- Josh Jones – percussion (3, 10)
- Pete Escovedo – shaker (7), timbales (7)
- Karl Perazzo – bongos (7), congas (7)
- Richard Howell – tenor saxophone (4, 6)
- Wayne Braxton – tenor saxophone (8)
- Wayne Wallace – trombone (4), horn conductor (4)
- Rich Armstrong – trumpet (2)
- Khalil Shaheed – trumpet (4)

Music arrangements

- Nelson Braxton – arrangements (3, 5, 10, 11)
- Louis "Paisley" Hinton – arrangements (3, 11)
- Ledisi – horn arrangements (4, 7), arrangements (5, 6, 10)
- Sundra "Sun" Manning – arrangements (10, 11)

Production

- Ledisi – executive producer, logo design
- Nelson Braxton – recording (1, 4-10), mixing (1, 3, 5)
- Ari Rios – recording (1, 3, 4, 6, 8, 11)
- Ben Leinbach – recording (2, 5, 11)
- Tony Mills – mixing (2, 7-10)
- Franklin Miller – recording (3)
- Michael Denten – mixing (4), recording (10)
- Wayne Braxton – recording (8)
- Ken Lee – mastering at Ken Lee Mastering (Oakland, California)
- Don Mizell – album sequencing
- Alex Butkus – graphics
- Peggy Moore – photography
