= BET Awards 2012 =

American entertainment awards ceremony

12th BET Awards
- Date: July 1, 2012
- Location: Shrine Auditorium, Los Angeles, California
- Presented by: Black Entertainment Television
- Hosted by: Samuel L. Jackson
- Website: http://www.bet.com/shows/bet-awards/2012.html

Television/radio coverage
- Network: BET
- Runtime: 210 minutes

The 12th BET Awards were held at the Shrine Auditorium in Los Angeles, California on July 1, 2012. The awards recognize Americans in music, acting, sports, and other fields of entertainment over the past year. Actor Samuel L. Jackson hosted the event for the first time. In honor of Whitney Houston, who died earlier in the year, a musical tribute was performed by Monica, Brandy, Gary Houston, Cissy Houston, Chaka Khan, while Mariah Carey shared some personal memories of her longtime friend.

The BET-televised event was watched by 7.42 million viewers and achieved a 3.2 rating in the adult 18-49 demographic, marking the highest numbers for the night on basic cable. Typically taking place every June, this was the first ceremony to be held in July.

== Performers ==
Artist(s)	Song(s)
Kanye West; Big Sean; Pusha T 2 Chainz	"Mercy" "Cold" (West) "New God Flow" (West)
Usher	"Climax"
Yolanda Adams; Jessica Reedy; Amber Bullock; Y'Anna Crawley	"You Brought the Sunshine"
Chanté Moore	Tribute to Donna Summer "Love to Love You Baby" "Bad Girls"
Charles Perry	"Home"
Nicki Minaj; 2 Chainz	"Champion" (Minaj); Beez in the Trap"
Valerie Simpson	"Ain't Nothing Like the Real Thing"
Melanie Fiona	"Wrong Side of a Love Song"
D'Angelo	"Untitled (How Does It Feel)" "Sugah Daddy"
Rick Ross; Wale; Meek Mill	"Bag of Money" "So Sophisticated" (Ross) "Black Magic"
Joe; Tyrese; Faith Evans	Tribute to Maze featuring Frankie Beverly: 1. "Can't Get Over You" (Joe); 2. "Joy and Pain" (Tyrese); 3. "Happy Feelin's" (Evans)
Maze featuring Frankie Beverly	"We Are One" "Before I Let Go"
Chris Brown	"Don't Wake Me Up" "Turn Up the Music"
Monica; Brandy; Gary Houston; Cissy Houston; Chaka Khan	Tribute to Whitney Houston: 1. "I Love the Lord" (Monica); 2. "I'm Your Baby Tonight" (Brandy); 3. "I Wanna Dance With Somebody" (Brandy); 4. "Where You Are" (G. Houston); 5. "Bridge Over Troubled Water" (C. Houston); 6. "I'm Every Woman" (Khan)
Cash Out; Tyga	"Cashin' Out" (Cash Out) "Rack City" (Tyga)

== Nominees and winners ==
Winners are highlighted in boldface:

Video of the Year	Video Director of the Year
**"Otis" – Jay-Z and Kanye West feat. Otis Redding**; "Countdown" – Beyoncé; "Love on Top" – Beyoncé; "N----s in Paris" – Jay-Z and Kanye West; "Climax" – Usher	**Beyoncé & Alan Ferguson**; Benny Boom; Chris Brown & Godfrey Taberez; Kanye West; Hype Williams
Best Female R&B Artist	Best Male R&B Artist
**Beyoncé**; Marsha Ambrosius; Mary J. Blige; Melanie Fiona; Rihanna	**Chris Brown**; Bruno Mars; Miguel; Trey Songz; Usher
Best Female Hip-Hop Artist	Best Male Hip-Hop Artist
**Nicki Minaj**; Diamond; Brianna Perry; Trina	**Drake**; Big Sean; J. Cole; Lil Wayne; Rick Ross; Young Jeezy
Best Collaboration	Best New Artist
**"Lotus Flower Bomb" – Wale feat. Miguel**; "Party" – Beyoncé feat. J. Cole; "Marvin Gaye & Chardonnay" – Big Sean feat. Kanye West & Roscoe Dash; "I'm On One" – DJ Khaled feat. Drake, Rick Ross & Lil Wayne; "The Motto" – Drake feat. Lil Wayne and Tyga; "Otis" – Jay-Z and Kanye West feat. Otis Redding	**Big Sean**; ASAP Rocky; Diggy; Future; Meek Mill
Best Group	Coca-Cola Viewers' Choice
**The Throne**; Bad Meets Evil; Diddy Dirty Money; Maybach Music Group; Mindless Behavior	**"Hello" – Mindless Behavior**; "The Motto" – Drake feat. Lil Wayne and Tyga; "Love on Top" – Beyoncé; "Turn Up the Music" – Chris Brown; "Otis" – Jay-Z and Kanye West feat. Otis Redding; "Lotus Flower Bomb" – Wale feat. Miguel
YoungStars Award	Centric Award
**Diggy**; Astro; Jacob Latimore; Keke Palmer; Willow Smith	**Common**; Estelle; Robert Glasper; Robin Thicke; Tyrese
Best Actress	Best Actor
**Viola Davis**; Angela Bassett; Taraji P. Henson; Regina King; Zoe Saldaña	**Kevin Hart**; Don Cheadle; Common; Idris Elba; Denzel Washington
Best Movie	Best Gospel Artist
**The Help**; Good Deeds; Jumping the Broom; Laugh at My Pain; Red Tails	**Yolanda Adams**; Kim Burrell; James Fortune & FIYA; Fred Hammond; Trin-I-Tee 5:7
Subway Sportswoman of the Year	Subway Sportsman of the Year
**Serena Williams**; Skylar Diggins; Candace Parker; Brittney Griner; Venus Williams	**Kevin Durant**; Carmelo Anthony; Kobe Bryant; Victor Cruz; LeBron James
Best International Act: Africa	Best International Act: United Kingdom
**Sarkodie (Ghana)** and **Wizkid (Nigeria)**; Camp Mulla (Kenya); Ice Prince (Nigeria); Lira (South Africa); Mokobé (Mali)	**Wretch 32**; Estelle; Labrinth; Emeli Sandé; Sway

=== FANdemonium Award ===
- **Chris Brown**
  - Lil Wayne
  - Mindless Behavior
  - Nicki Minaj
  - Rihanna
  - Trey Songz

=== BET Lifetime Achievement Award ===
- **Maze featuring Frankie Beverly**

=== BET Humanitarian Award ===
- **Rev. Al Sharpton**
