= Ledisi for Dinah Tour =

2025 concert tour by Ledisi

- Tour by Ledisi
- Location: North America; Europe
- Associated album: For Dinah
- Start date: October 2, 2025
- End date: August 28, 2026
- Legs: 1
- No. of shows: 23

Ledisi concert chronology
- European Tour (2025); Ledisi for Dinah Tour (2025-2026); The Crown Tour (2025)

Ledisi for Dinah Tour is the fifteenth concert tour by American singer and songwriter Ledisi in support of her thirteenth studio album For Dinah (2025). The tour began on October 2, 2025, in Chandler, Arizona.

== Overview ==
In July 2025, Ledisi announced a series of concert tours she would be embarking on for the remainder of the year. The Ledisi for Dinah Tour began on October 2, 2025, in Chandler, Arizona, a day before the release of the For Dinah. The tour only reached the United States. Originally planned to be a concert tour of four dates, the tour was expanded after a four months after it had initially concluded. After the tour had concluded, Ledisi resumed the second half of her European Tour. Following the conclusion of the European Tour in late October 2025, she embarked on sixteenth concert tour aptly titled The Crown Tour in November 2025, in support of her twelfth studio album The Crown.

In February 2026, Ledisi announced via Instagram that more concert dates were added to the tour, beginning with the February 21, 2026, concert in Grand Rapids, Michigan.

== Critical reception ==
Ghalib Shiraz Dhalla of online publication Indulge Magazine reviewed the Walt Disney Concert Hall show held on October 3, 2025. She remarked, "This was the kind of concert we rarely get anymore: unapologetically steeped in jazz tradition yet alive with emotional immediacy." Andrew Gilbert for the San Francisco Chronicle reviewed the October 6, 2025, concert performance, giving it a mixed review as Gilbert praised several of Ledisi's traditional arrangements but felt the "slyly funky arrangement of 'This Bitter Earth,' which brought to mind the Ahmad Jamal Trio, was less successful, sapping the song of some of its devastating, self-dramatizing loneliness."

== Set list ==
This set list from the October 3, 2025, concert in Los Angeles.

1. "Our Love Is Here to Stay"
2. "What a Difference a Day Makes"
3. "If I Never Get to Heaven"
4. "You Don't Know What Love Is"
5. "You've Got What It Takes"
6. "Don't Go to Strangers"
7. "Nobody Knows the Way I Feel This Morning"
8. This Bitter Earth

=== Europe ===
1. "Our Love is Here to Stay"
2. "Soulville"
3. "If I Never Get to Heaven"
4. "You Don't Know What Love Is"
5. "You've Got What It Takes"
6. "What a Difference a Day Makes"
7. "Nobody Knows the Way I Feel This Morning"
8. "You Go to My Head"
9. "Love You Too"
10. "Sometimes I'm Happy"
11. "Caravan"
12. "This Bitter Earth"
13. "BLKWMN"
14. "Do Nothing Till You Hear From Me"
15. "Alright" / "Gonna Be Alright"

== Tour dates ==
List of concerts showing date, city, country, venue and opening acts
| Date | City | Country | Venue |
|---|---|---|---|
| October 2, 2025 | Chandler | United States | Chandler Center for the Arts |
| October 3, 2025 | Los Angeles | United States | Walt Disney Concert Hall |
| October 5, 2025 | Davis | United States | Mondavi Center |
| October 6, 2025 | San Francisco | United States | Louise M. Davies Symphony Hall |
| February 21, 2026 | Grand Rapids | United States | DeVos Place Convention Center |
| April 17, 2026 | Downtown Seattle | United States | Benaroya Hall |
| May 16, 2026 | Milwaukee | United States | Warner Grand Theater (Bradley Symphony Center) |
| July 7, 2026 | Budapest | Hungary | Mupa |
| July 8, 2026 | Athens | Greece | Gazarte |
| July 9, 2026 | Trier | Germany | Buhne in Brunnenhof |
| July 11, 2026 | Madeira | Portugal | Funchal Jazz Festival |
| July 12, 2026 | Madeira | Portugal | Masterclass |
| July 13, 2026 | Madrid | Spain | Sala Villanos |
| July 16, 2026 | Torrent | Spain | Jazz Panorama |
| July 17, 2026 | Paris | France | New Morning |
| July 18, 2026 | Krosno | Poland | Young Arts Festival |
| July 19, 2026 | Poznan | Poland | Blue Summer Jazz Festival |
| July 21, 2026 | Wolfsburg | Germany | Sommerfestival |
| July 22, 2026 | Potsdam | Germany | Open Air |
| August 21, 2026 | North Bethesda | United States | The Music Center at Strathmore |
| August 22, 2026 | North Bethesda | United States | The Music Center at Strathmore |
| August 27, 2026 | Saratoga | United States | The Mountain Winery |
| August 28, 2026 | Modesto | United States | Gallo Center for the Arts |

== Personnel ==
- Brandon Waddles – music director / piano
- Brandon Rose – bass
- Gregory Clark Jr – drums
- Dr. Chelsey Green – violin (for the October 3, 2025, concert)
