= Love You Too =

Love You Too may refer to:

- "Love You Too", a song by Brothers Osborne from Brothers Osborne, 2023
- "Love You Too", a song by Ledisi from The Crown, 2025
  - Love You Too Tour, a 2025 concert tour by Ledisi
- "Love You Too", a song by Lil Durk featuring Kehlani, 2021

== See also ==
- "Love You To", a song by the Beatles, 1966
- Love You Two, a 2019 Philippine television series
