= List of Billboard number-one R&B albums of 1989 =

These are the Billboard magazine R&B albums to have reached number one in 1989.

== Chart history ==
Issue date	Album	Artist
January 7	Giving You the Best That I Got	Anita Baker
January 14	Giving You the Best That I Got	Anita Baker
January 21	Giving You the Best That I Got	Anita Baker
January 28	Karyn White	Karyn White
February 4	Karyn White	Karyn White
February 11	Karyn White	Karyn White
February 18	Karyn White	Karyn White
February 25	Karyn White	Karyn White
March 4	Karyn White	Karyn White
March 11	Karyn White	Karyn White
March 18	Don't Be Cruel	Bobby Brown
March 25	Don't Be Cruel	Bobby Brown
April 1	Don't Be Cruel	Bobby Brown
April 8	Let's Get It Started	MC Hammer
April 15	Guy	Guy
April 22	Guy	Guy
April 29	Guy	Guy
May 6	Guy	Guy
May 13	The Great Adventures of Slick Rick	Slick Rick
May 20	Guy	Guy
May 27	3 Feet High and Rising	De La Soul
June 3	3 Feet High and Rising	De La Soul
June 10	3 Feet High and Rising	De La Soul
June 17	3 Feet High and Rising	De La Soul
June 24	3 Feet High and Rising	De La Soul
July 1	The Great Adventures of Slick Rick	Slick Rick
July 8	The Great Adventures of Slick Rick	Slick Rick
July 15	The Great Adventures of Slick Rick	Slick Rick
July 22	The Great Adventures of Slick Rick	Slick Rick
July 29	Walking with a Panther	LL Cool J
August 5	Walking with a Panther	LL Cool J
August 12	Walking with a Panther	LL Cool J
August 19	Walking with a Panther	LL Cool J
August 26	Big Tyme	Heavy D and the Boyz
September 2	Keep On Movin'	Soul II Soul
September 9	Big Tyme	Heavy D and the Boyz
September 16	Unfinished Business	EPMD
September 23	Unfinished Business	EPMD
September 30	No One Can Do It Better	The D.O.C.
October 7	No One Can Do It Better	The D.O.C.
October 14	Tender Lover	Babyface
October 21	Tender Lover	Babyface
October 28	Tender Lover	Babyface
November 4	Tender Lover	Babyface
November 11	Silky Soul	Frankie Beverly and Maze
November 18	Janet Jackson's Rhythm Nation 1814	Janet Jackson
November 25	Janet Jackson's Rhythm Nation 1814	Janet Jackson
December 2	Stay with Me	Regina Belle
December 9	Janet Jackson's Rhythm Nation 1814	Janet Jackson
December 16	Tender Lover	Babyface
December 23	Tender Lover	Babyface
December 30	Tender Lover	Babyface

== See also ==
- 1989 in music
- R&B number-one hits of 1989 (USA)
