= Love You Too Tour =

2025 concert tour by Ledisi

- Tour by Ledisi
- Promotional poster for the tour
- Location: North America
- Associated album: The Crown
- Start date: May 28, 2025
- End date: June 29, 2025
- No. of shows: 23
- Supporting acts: Marsha Ambrosius; Rahsaan Patterson; Kindred the Family Soul

Ledisi concert chronology
- The Good Life Tour (2024); Love You Too Tour (2025); European Tour 2025 (2025)

The Love You Too Tour (also known as the Love You Too: The Tour) was the thirteenth concert tour by American singer and songwriter Ledisi in support of her twelfth studio album The Crown (2025). As her eleventh overall solo tour, it commenced on May 28, 2025, in Baltimore, Maryland, and concluded on June 29, 2025, in Savannah, Georgia.

== Background ==
On January 31, 2025, Ledisi released a single titled "Love You Too". On February 9, 2015, Ledisi performed the "Lift Every Voice and Sing" at Super Bowl LIX, at the Caesars Superdome in New Orleans, Louisiana. The Love You Too Tour was announced on February 10, 2025. Singers Marsha Ambrosius, Rahsaan Patterson, and music group Kindred the Family Soul will also be touring as opening acts on selected dates. On February 12, 2025, concert tickets went on presale.

Starting on April 1, 2025, Ledisi and Marsha Ambrosius uploaded a videos together in-studio, discussing the making of the concert tour, their favorite venue to perform at, and songs they love to perform. On April 25, 2025, Ledisi released her twelfth album The Crown. In May 2025, The Baltimore Sun held a brief entry contest to give two concert tickets for the Lyric Baltimore show in Baltimore.

== Production ==
On May 27, 2025, one day before the opening night of the tour, Ledisi unveiled a preview of the stage layout and rehearsal via social media. The staging consists of a wide structure with a LED lit quadrupled-stacked circular platform in the center of the stage. The stage also featured rotating pink and purple lights. The tour's wardrobe was mostly custom-made or styled by fashion designer Nonja McKenzie. Ledisi donned a black sequined shawl-lapel blazer jacket, a black corset, and black tights. The outfit serves as her sole attire for throughout each concert.

== Concert synopsis ==
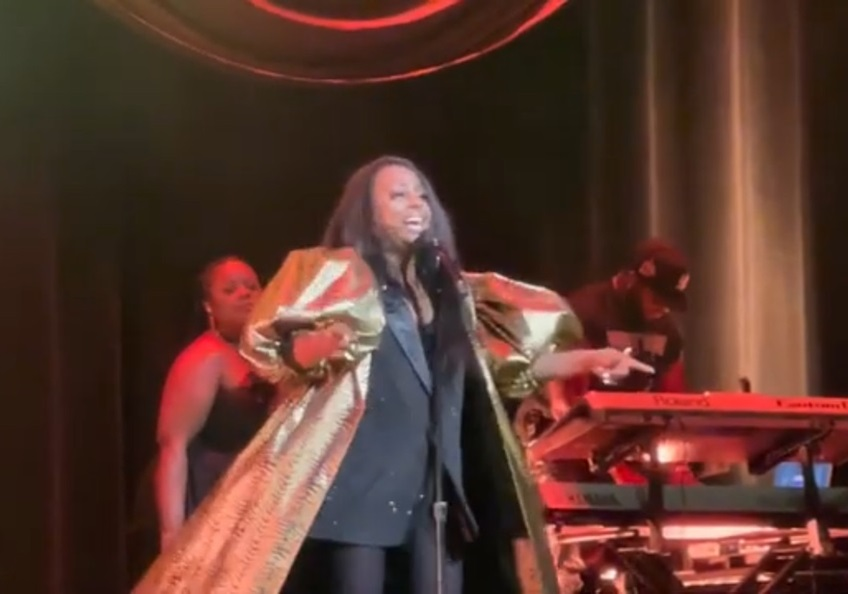
Ledisi performing "BLKWMN" in a golden cape

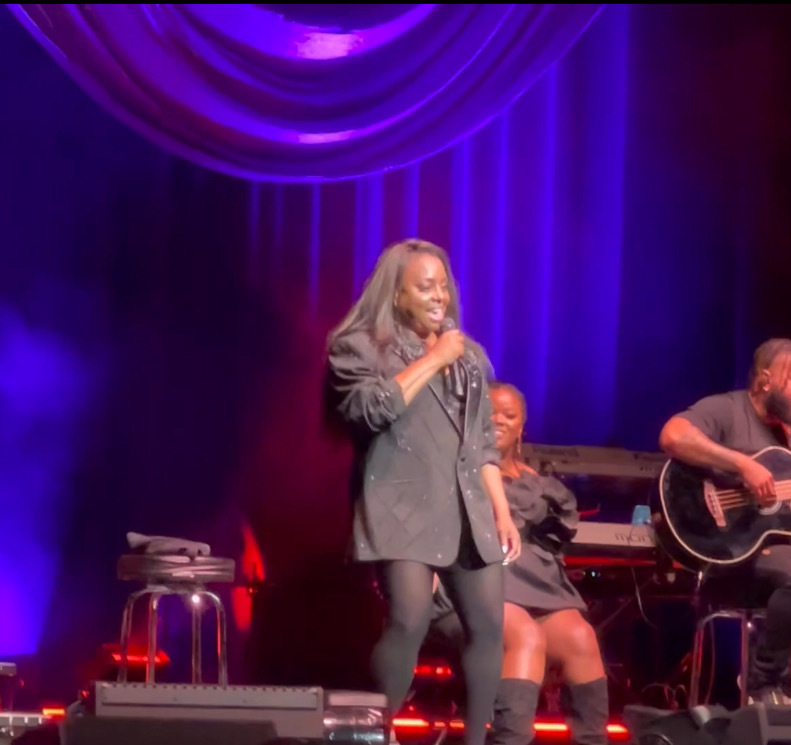
Ledisi performing "Daydreaming"

The concert begins with Ledisi emerging onto a quadruple-layered LED platform in the center of the stage. She opens the show with "Keep U in Mind". Before the start of "I Need to Know", Ledisi returned to the top of platform and performs the song with the microphone held a microphone stand. She remains on the platform throughout the performance of "7 Days of Weak" as red LED lights are surrounding her. She steps off of the platform for the song "Daydreaming".

During the tribute segment, Ledisi is joined by her band in a stationary seated performance. She began by performing "Happy Feelings", a tribute to Frankie Beverly who died in September 2024, respectively. She continued with "No More Rain (In This Cloud)", "Whatever You Want", and "Everybody Loves the Sunshine", a tribute to Angie Stone, D'Wayne Wiggins, and Roy Ayers; all of whom died in March 2025.

Following the tribute segment, Ledisi is joined by her guitarist Xavier Lynn as duet partner for "Stay Together". After the performance of "In the Morning", the band retreat back to their original positions on stage. She donned a golden cape during the performance of "BLKWMN". She closed the show with "Anything for You", followed by "I Blame You" before exiting the stage.

== Critical reception ==
Martin Tsai of New Jersey Arts remarked that "what stood out from her set were the extended ad-libs that you didn't get on the records, which drove fans wild." Brian Lumley of the Cleveland Scene, who attended the House of Blues show, praised Ambrosius' performance by stating, "Rarely has an opening act received as much applause from the attendees, but Marsha Ambrosius pulled as many cheers as headliner Ledisi did an hour later." Zaria Mac of The St. Louis American wrote "Though singing live, her voice perfectly matched the record. She sang in tandem with the audience, getting lost in her signature runs as she moved along the edge of the stage."

== Set list ==
1. "Keep U in Mind"
2. "Add to Me"
3. "Good Life"
4. "Alright"
5. "Gonna Be Alright (F.T.B.)"
6. "High"
7. "Love You Too"
8. "I Need to Know"
9. "7 Days of Weak"
10. "Daydreaming"
11. "Happy Feelings"
12. "No More Rain (In This Cloud)" / "Whatever You Want" / "Everybody Loves the Sunshine" / "My Life"
13. "Stay Together" / "Goin' Thru Changes"
14. "In the Morning"
15. "I Do"
16. "BLKWMN"
17. "Pieces of Me"
18. "Anything for You"
19. "I Blame You"

== Tour dates ==
List of concerts showing date, city, country, venue and opening acts
Date	City	Country	Venue	Opening acts	Attendance
May 28	Baltimore	United States	Lyric Baltimore	Marsha Ambrosius	—N/a
May 30	National Harbor (Note: Billed as Washington, D.C.)	United States	The Theater at MGM National Harbor	Marsha Ambrosius	3,000 / 3,000
May 31	National Harbor	United States	The Theater at MGM National Harbor	Marsha Ambrosius	3,000 / 3,000
June 1	Newark	United States	New Jersey Performing Arts Center	Marsha Ambrosius	—N/a
June 3	Virginia Beach	United States	The Dome	Marsha Ambrosius	—N/a
June 4	Wilmington	United States	Wilson Center at Cape Fear Community College	Marsha Ambrosius	—N/a
June 6	Atlantic City	United States	Circus Maximus Theater	Marsha Ambrosius	—N/a
June 7	Durham	United States	Durham Performing Arts Center	Marsha Ambrosius	—N/a
June 8	Columbia	United States	Columbia Township Auditorium	Marsha Ambrosius	—N/a
June 10	Louisville	United States	Palace Theatre	Marsha Ambrosius	—N/a
June 12	Chicago	United States	Chicago Theatre	Marsha Ambrosius	—N/a
June 13	Milwaukee	United States	Riverside Theater	Marsha Ambrosius	—N/a
June 14	Detroit	United States	Aretha Franklin Amphitheater	Rahsaan Patterson	—N/a
June 17	Cleveland	United States	House of Blues	Marsha Ambrosius	—N/a
June 19	St. Louis	United States	Stifel Theatre	Marsha Ambrosius	—N/a
June 20	Florence	United States	Turfway Park Event Center	Marsha Ambrosius	—N/a
June 21	Memphis	United States	Orpheum Theatre	Marsha Ambrosius	—N/a
June 22	Huntsville	United States	Mark C. Smith Concert Hall	Marsha Ambrosius	—N/a
June 24	Charlotte	United States	Ovens Auditorium	Marsha Ambrosius	—N/a
June 25	Greenville	United States	Peace Center	Marsha Ambrosius	—N/a
June 27	Jacksonville	United States	Florida Theatre	Marsha Ambrosius	—N/a
June 28	Stockbridge	United States	Stockbridge Amphitheater	Kindred the Family Soul	—N/a
June 29	Savannah	United States	Savannah Civic Center	Marsha Ambrosius	—N/a

Cancellations

June 16, 2025	Toronto	Massey Hall	Cancelled

== Personnel ==
- Jermaine Parrish - Drums
- Joe Harley - Keyboard
- Ronald Alexander - Bass
- Xavier Lynn - Guitar, backup vocals
- Camille Grisby - Backup vocals
- Sara Williams - Backup vocals

== European Tour ==
European Tour
- Tour by Ledisi
- Promotional poster for the tour
- Location: Europe
- Associated album: The Crown
- Start date: July 4, 2025
- End date: October 25, 2025
- No. of shows: 21

Ledisi concert chronology
- Love You Too Tour (2025); European Tour (2025); Ledisi for Dinah Tour (2025)

On July 4, 2025, Ledisi embarked on the first part of her European Tour which commenced at the Rudolstadt-Festival in Germany. The first part of the tour played for nine dates. The tour came to a brief halt due to the upcoming release of her thirteenth studio album For Dinah, which was released on October 3, 2025. She embarked on the Ledisi for Dinah Tour, which played four dates from October 2 to October 6, 2025.

On October 9, 2025, the European Tour resumed with Ledisi performing at the O2 Shepherd's Bush Empire in Shepherd's Bush, West London. The set list was altered to include songs from her album For Dinah, which was released on October 3, 2025. The tour concluded at Kino SC on October 25, 2025, in Zagreb, Croatia.

=== Set list ===
1. "Keep U in Mind"
2. "Add to Me"
3. "Good Life"
4. "Alright"
5. "Gonna Be Alright (F.T.B.)"
6. "High"
7. "Love You Too"
8. "I Need to Know"
9. "7 Days of Weak"
10. "Daydreaming"
11. "Wild Is the Wind"
12. "Sea Lion Woman"
13. "You Go to My Head"
14. "Nobody Knows the Way I Feel This Morning"
15. "Sugar / Brown Sugar"
16. "This Bitter Earth"
17. "Love Never Changes"
18. "Pieces of Me"
19. "Anything for You"
20. "I Blame You"

=== European Tour dates ===
List of concerts showing date, city, country, venue and opening acts
Date	City	Country	Venue
July 4	Rudolstadt	Germany	Rudolstadt-Festival
July 5	Hamburg	Germany	Nica Jazz Festival
July 6	Copenhagen	Denmark	Roots & Jazz
July 8	Stuttgart	Germany	BIX Jazzclub & Lounge
July 9	Paris	France	Alhambra
July 13	Thomery	France	Festival Rosa Bonheur
July 15	Perugia	Italy	Umbria Jazz Festival
July 18	Warsaw	Poland	Lazienki Park
July 19	Kraków	Poland	Botanic Garden of the Jagiellonian University
October 9	London	United Kingdom	O2 Shepherd's Bush Empire
October 10	Aulnay-sous-Bois	France	Le Nouveau Cap
October 11	Cébazat	France	Sémaphore
October 13	Madrid	Spain	Sala Apolo
October 15	Utrecht	Netherlands	TivoliVredenburg
October 16	Den Haag	Netherlands	PAARD Grolsch Zaal
October 17	Amsterdam	Netherlands	Poppodium Q-Factory
October 18	Hautmont	France	Centre Culturel Maurice Schumann
October 19	Stockholm	Sweden	Stockholm Jazz Festival
October 23	Oslo	Norway	Cosmopolite Scene
October 24	Malmö	Sweden	Victoriateatern Malmö
October 25	Zagreb	Croatia	Kino SC
