= List of Billboard number-one R&B albums of 1985 =

These are the Billboard magazine R&B albums that reached number one in 1985.

== Chart history ==
Issue date	Album	Artist
January 5	New Edition	New Edition
January 12	New Edition	New Edition
January 19	New Edition	New Edition
January 26	New Edition	New Edition
February 2	New Edition	New Edition
February 9	Solid	Ashford & Simpson
February 16	Solid	Ashford & Simpson
February 23	Solid	Ashford & Simpson
March 2	Solid	Ashford & Simpson
March 9	Gap Band VI	The Gap Band
March 16	Gap Band VI	The Gap Band
March 23	Private Dancer	Tina Turner
March 30	Private Dancer	Tina Turner
April 6	Nightshift	The Commodores
April 13	Nightshift	The Commodores
April 20	Nightshift	The Commodores
April 27	Can't Stop the Love	Frankie Beverly and Maze
May 4	The Night I Fell in Love	Luther Vandross
May 11	The Night I Fell in Love	Luther Vandross
May 18	The Night I Fell in Love	Luther Vandross
May 25	The Night I Fell in Love	Luther Vandross
June 1	The Night I Fell in Love	Luther Vandross
June 8	The Night I Fell in Love	Luther Vandross
June 15	The Night I Fell in Love	Luther Vandross
June 22	Whitney Houston	Whitney Houston
June 29	Rock Me Tonight	Freddie Jackson
July 6	Rock Me Tonight	Freddie Jackson
July 13	Rock Me Tonight	Freddie Jackson
July 20	Rock Me Tonight	Freddie Jackson
July 27	Rock Me Tonight	Freddie Jackson
August 3	Rock Me Tonight	Freddie Jackson
August 10	Rock Me Tonight	Freddie Jackson
August 17	Rock Me Tonight	Freddie Jackson
August 24	Rock Me Tonight	Freddie Jackson
August 31	Rock Me Tonight	Freddie Jackson
September 7	Whitney Houston	Whitney Houston
September 14	Whitney Houston	Whitney Houston
September 21	Whitney Houston	Whitney Houston
September 28	Whitney Houston	Whitney Houston
October 5	Whitney Houston	Whitney Houston
October 12	Rock Me Tonight	Freddie Jackson
October 19	Rock Me Tonight	Freddie Jackson
October 26	Rock Me Tonight	Freddie Jackson
November 2	Rock Me Tonight	Freddie Jackson
November 9	In Square Circle	Stevie Wonder
November 16	In Square Circle	Stevie Wonder
November 23	In Square Circle	Stevie Wonder
November 30	In Square Circle	Stevie Wonder
December 7	In Square Circle	Stevie Wonder
December 14	In Square Circle	Stevie Wonder
December 21	In Square Circle	Stevie Wonder
December 28	In Square Circle	Stevie Wonder

== See also ==
- 1985 in music
- R&B number-one hits of 1985 (USA)
