= Silky Soul =

Studio album by Maze
- Released: September 1989
- Recorded: 1988–89
- Genres: Soul, funk
- Length: 57:46
- Label: Warner Bros.
- Producer: Frankie Beverly

Maze chronology
Live in Los Angeles (1986)	Silky Soul (1989)	Back to Basics (1993)

Silky Soul is the seventh album and ninth overall album by the Bay Area-based R&B group Maze, released in 1989 on Warner Bros. Records.

== Critical reception ==
Professional ratings
Review scores
Source	Rating
AllMusic	4/5 stars
Chicago Tribune	3.5/4 stars
The Encyclopedia of Popular Music	3/5 stars
Los Angeles Times	3/5 stars
The Rolling Stone Album Guide	3.5/5 stars

The Rolling Stone Album Guide wrote that Silky Soul "finds Maze updating its graceful sound with a subtly bracing touch of synthesized rhythms." The Boston Globe thought that Frankie Beverly ably spans "boudoir intimacies and pleas for South African liberation and black cooperation—all with a voice as cool and buttery as [Marvin] Gaye's."

== Track listing ==
All songs written by Frankie Beverly

1. "Silky Soul" 6:44
2. "Can't Get Over You" 5:23
3. "Just Us" 7:39
4. "Somebody Else's Arms" 5:53
5. "Midnight" 6:32
6. "Love's on the Run" 5:34
7. "Change Our Ways" 5:15
8. "Songs of Love" 6:14
9. "Mandela" 6:36
10. "Africa" 2:11

== Charts ==
Year	Album	Chart positions		
Year	Album	US	US R&B	UK
1989	Silky Soul	37	1	43

=== Singles ===
Year	Single	Chart positions		
Year	Single	US	US R&B	UK
1989	"Can't Get Over You"	—	1	89
1989	"Silky Soul"	—	4	—
1990	"Love's on the Run"	—	13	—
1990	"Songs of Love"	—	37	—

== See also ==
- List of Billboard number-one R&B albums of 1989
