= Golden Time of Day =

Studio album by Maze
- Released: 1978
- Recorded: 1978
- Studio: Applewood, Golden, Colorado
- Genre: Soul, funk
- Length: 40:58
- Label: Capitol
- Producer: Frankie Beverly

Maze chronology
Maze featuring Frankie Beverly (1977)	Golden Time of Day (1978)	Inspiration (1979)

Professional ratings
Review scores
Source	Rating
AllMusic	3/5 stars

Golden Time of Day is the second album by Bay Area-based R&B group Maze, released in 1978 on Capitol Records.

== Track listing ==
All tracks written by Frankie Beverly.

1. "Travelin' Man" – 5:06
2. "Song for My Mother" – 5:02
3. "You're Not the Same" – 5:13
4. "Workin' Together" – 5:30
5. "Golden Time of Day" – 5:30
6. "I Wish You Well" – 4:37
7. "I Need You" – 10:00

== Personnel ==
- Frankie Beverly: Vocals, rhythm guitar
- Wayne Thomas: Lead guitar
- Sam Porter: Keyboards
- Robin Duhe: Bass
- Joe Provost: Drums on tracks 1 and 6
- Ahaguna B. Sun: Drums on all other tracks
- Ronald Lowry: Congas, backing vocals
- McKinley Williams: Percussion, backing vocals

== Charts ==
=== Weekly charts ===
Chart (1978)	Peak position
US Billboard 200	27
US Top R&B/Hip-Hop Albums (Billboard)	9

=== Year-end charts ===
Chart (1978)	Position
US Top R&B/Hip-Hop Albums (Billboard)	32

=== Singles ===
Year	Single	Chart positions		
Year	Single	US	US R&B	US Dance
1978	"Golden Time Of Day"	—	39	—
1978	"I Wish You Well"	—	61	—
1978	"Travelin' Man"	—	39	—
1978	"Workin' Together"	—	9	—
