= Back in Stride =

Single by Maze

from the album Can't Stop the Love
- B-side: "Joy and Pain (live)"
- Released: 1985
- Genre: R&B
- Length: 4:10
- Label: Capitol Records
- Songwriter(s): Frankie Beverly

Maze singles chronology
"I Wanna Thank You" (1983)	"Back in Stride" (1985)	"Too Many Games" (1985)

"Back In Stride" is a 1985 single by Philadelphia based R&B group Maze. As with all of Maze's releases, the vocals were performed by Frankie Beverly, who also wrote and produced the single. The mid-tempo single claimed the number one spot on the soul singles chart, remaining there for two weeks, and reached number 88 on the Billboard Hot 100, in early 1985.
