= For Dinah =

Studio album by Ledisi
- Released: October 3, 2025
- Genres: Jazz, traditional pop
- Labels: Listen Back Entertainment; Candid Records
- Producers: Ledisi; Christian McBride; Rex Rideout

Ledisi chronology
The Crown (2025)	For Dinah (2025)

Singles from For Dinah
- 1. "This Bitter Earth" Released: July 18, 2025; 2. "What a Difference a Day Made" Released: August 22, 2025; 3. "You've Got What It Takes" Released: September 12, 2025; 4. "Teach Me Tonight" Released: February 20, 2026; 5. "Nobody Knows the Way I Feel This Morning" Released: September 18, 2026

For Dinah is the thirteenth studio album by American singer Ledisi. The album was released on October 3, 2025, by her record label Listen Back Entertainment and distributed by Candid Records. For Dinah is a tribute album to American singer Dinah Washington. The album was recorded in 2025 and produced by Ledisi, alongside Rex Rideout, and Christian McBride. The album features guest appearances by Christian McBride and Gregory Porter.

The album was marketed with the release of several singles, including "This Bitter Earth", "What a Difference a Day Made", "You've Got What It Takes", "Teach Me Tonight", and "Nobody Knows the Way I Feel This Morning". To further promote the album, Ledisi embarked on the Ledisi for Dinah Tour (2025–26). The album was nominated for Best Jazz Vocal Album at the 69th Annual Grammy Awards.

== Background and development ==
She [Dinah] gave me permission to move freely, create freely, be a woman in leadership, wear and say what I want. Before there was Aretha, there was Dinah. She deserves to be recognized in today's music as well. I felt her pain, her rejection. This is where I come from — and this is my way of saying her name out loud.

— Ledisi (Rated R&B interview)

Following the conclusion of the Love You Too Tour, Ledisi announced her next album would titled For Dinah; a tribute album to American singer Dinah Washington to be released on October 3, 2025. The concept of album originated from an idea, eight years prior to the recording of the album.

In a press release, Ledisi stated that Dinah Washington had been a major impact on her since adolescence. She recalled her mother playing Washington's music around their house.

== Recording and production ==
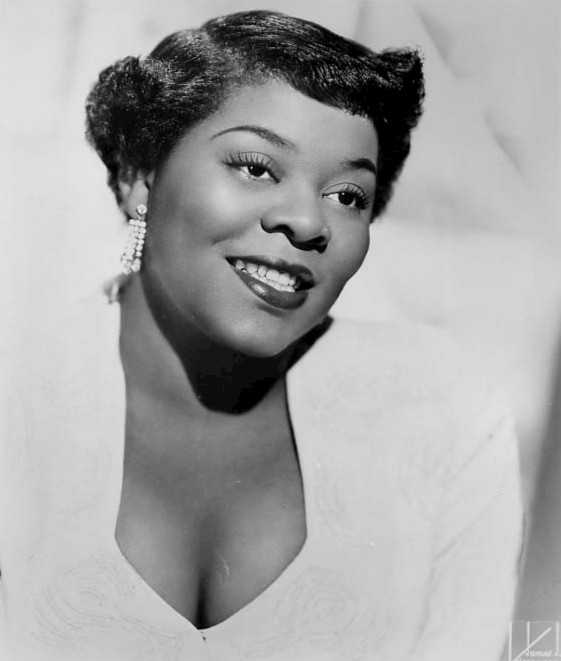
Dinah Washington in 1952

The entire album was produced by American music producer Rex Rideout and American jazz musician Christian McBride. The album also features McBride as a guest musician on the jazz standard "You Don't Know What Love Is". In addition to recording original songs by Dinah Washington, Ledisi also recorded several of Washington's covered songs of which she made popular including "What a Difference a Day Made" and "You Don't Know What Love Is".

American singer and musician Gregory Porter performed a duet with Ledisi on the song "You've Got What It Takes"; originally recorded by Washington and Brook Benton. American musician Paul Jackson Jr. also appears on the song "You Go to My Head". Ledisi also enlisted additional musicians including Sara Hewitt-Roth, McClenty Hunter Jr, Michael King, Yuko Naito-Gotay, Lisa Matricardi, and Antoine Silverman.

== Release and promotion ==
The album was released on October 3, 2025, by her record label Listen Back Entertainment and distributed by Candid Records. In addition to physical compact disc and digital formats, autographed copies of the album were also made available during the pre-order of For Dinah. A deluxe edition of the album was released on October 9, 2026.

=== Singles ===
"This Bitter Earth" was released the album's lead single on July 18, 2025. Rather than release the song in traditional single format, the song was made available to stream on digital music platforms along with the pre-order of the album. An in-studio performance video, directed by Ron T. Young, was released to Ledisi's social media platforms. On August 22, 2025, she released "What a Difference a Day Made" as the album's second single. You've Got What It Takes was released as the album's third single on September 12, 2025. Like its predecessors, the song did not receive a formal release as a single but rather made available to stream on digital music platforms with the pre-order of the album.

On February 20, 2026, "Teach Me Tonight" was released as the first single from the Deluxe Edition and fourth overall single, which was originally planned to be on the standard edition of the album. "Nobody Knows the Way I Feel This Morning" was released as the second single from the Deluxe Edition and fifth overall single on September 18, 2026.

=== Tour ===
In July 2025, Ledisi announced that she would embark on a concert tour, titled Ledisi for Dinah Tour. The concert tour began on October 2, 2025, in Chandler, Arizona and originally concluded on October 6, 2025, in San Francisco, California. The final show in 2025 was reviewed by Andrew Gilbert for the San Francisco Chronicle. The concert performance received a mixed review as Gilbert praised several of her traditional arrangements but felt the "slyly funky arrangement of 'This Bitter Earth,' which brought to mind the Ahmad Jamal Trio, was less successful, sapping the song of some of its devastating, self-dramatizing loneliness." The tour resumed in February 2026.

== Critical reception ==
Professional ratings
Review scores
Source	Rating
AllMusic	4/5 stars
Jazzwise	4/5 stars

For Dinah received generally positive reviews from music critics. AllMusic's Andy Kellman referred to the album as "reverent and creative", comparing it to Ledisi's past album Ledisi Sings Nina. Peter Quinn of British magazine Jazzwise gave the album a four-star rating. Quinn praised Ledisi's selection of cover songs that "showcase Ledisi’s remarkable vocal range, playfully intimate one moment, deeply soulful the next."

== Commercial performance ==
For Dinah debuted at number seventeen on Billboard's Jazz Albums chart and number fifteen on the Traditional Jazz Albums chart during the week of October 18, 2025.

== Track listing ==
Standard edition
No.	Title	Length
1.	"What a Difference a Day Made"	4:46
2.	"If I Never Get To Heaven"	6:06
3.	"Caravan"	2:43
4.	"Let's Do It"	2:57
5.	"You Don't Know What Love Is" (featuring Christian McBride)	5:13
6.	"You've Got What It Takes" (featuring Gregory Porter)	3:19
7.	"You Go to My Head"	3:10
8.	"This Bitter Earth"	5:05

Deluxe edition
No.	Title	Length
1.	"What a Difference a Day Made"	4:46
2.	"If I Never Get To Heaven"	6:06
3.	"Caravan"	2:43
4.	"Let's Do It"	2:57
5.	"You Don't Know What Love Is" (featuring Christian McBride)	5:13
6.	"You've Got What It Takes" (featuring Gregory Porter)	3:19
7.	"You Go to My Head"	3:10
8.	"This Bitter Earth"	5:05
9.	"What a Difference a Day Made (Village Studio Session)"	5:11
10.	"Teach Me Tonight"	3:37
11.	"Nobody Knows the Way I Feel This Morning"	3:52
12.	"Ill Wind (You're Blowin' Me No Good)"

== Charts ==
=== Weekly charts ===
Weekly chart performance for For Dinah
Chart (2025)	Peak position
US Top Jazz Albums (Billboard)	17
US Traditional Jazz Albums (Billboard)	12
UK Jazz & Blues Albums (Official Charts)	24
