= Back to Basics (Maze album) =

Studio album by Maze
- Released: August 10, 1993
- Recorded: 1992–93
- Genre: Soul, funk
- Length: 53:28
- Label: Warner Bros.
- Producer: Frankie Beverly

Maze chronology
Silky Soul (1989)	Back to Basics (1993)

Back to Basics is the eighth studio album and tenth overall album by Bay Area-based R&B group Maze, released in 1993 on Warner Bros. Records. It is currently their last studio album to date, and also the last album to feature singer Frankie Beverly before his death in 2024.

Professional ratings
Review scores
Source	Rating
Allmusic	2/5 stars

== Track listing ==
All songs written by Frankie Beverly

1. "Nobody Knows What You Feel Inside" 5:36
2. "Love Is" 5:38
3. "The Morning After" 5:38
4. "Laid Back Girl" 5:30
5. "What Goes Up" 6:11
6. "In Time" 6:05
7. "All Night Long" 5:25
8. "Don't Wanna Lose Your Love" 5:44
9. "Twilight" (Instrumental) 7:27

== Charts ==
Year	Album	Chart positions	
Year	Album	US	US R&B
1993	Back to Basics	37	3

=== Singles ===
Year	Single	Chart positions	
Year	Single	US	US R&B
1993	"Laid Back Girl"	—	15
1993	"The Morning After"	115	19
1994	"What Goes Up"	—	32
