= Inspiration (Maze album) =

Studio album by Maze
- Released: 1979
- Recorded: 1979
- Studio: Studio in the Country, Bogalusa, Louisiana
- Genre: Soul, funk
- Length: 41:12
- Label: Capitol
- Producer: Frankie Beverly

Maze chronology
Golden Time of Day (1978)	Inspiration (1979)	Joy and Pain (1980)

Inspiration is the third album by Bay Area-based R&B group Maze, released in 1979 on Capitol Records.

Professional ratings
Review scores
Source	Rating
AllMusic	4.5/5 stars

== Track listing ==
All Songs Written by Frankie Beverly

1. "Lovely Inspiration" - 5:08
2. "Feel That You're Feelin'" - 5:33
3. "Call On Me" - 5:42
4. "Timin'" - 5:02
5. "Welcome Home" - 5:08
6. "Woman is a Wonder" - 7:20
7. "Ain't It Strange" - 5:27
8. "Lovely Inspiration" (instrumental) - 1:56

== Charts ==
Year	Album	Chart positions	
Year	Album	US	US R&B
1979	Inspiration	33	5

=== Singles ===
Year	Single	Chart positions		
Year	Single	US	US R&B	US Dance
1979	"Feel That You're Feelin'"	67	7	—
1979	"Timin'"	—	55	—
