= Can't Stop the Love =

Can't Stop the Love may refer to:

- Can't Stop the Love (album), 1985 album by Maze
- "Can't Stop the Love" (song), 2014 song by Neon Jungle
