= Sue Reno =

American fiber artist

Sue Reno

Sue Reno is a fiber artist from Pittsburgh, Pennsylvania, known for creating art quilts that draw from her studies of botany, wildlife, historic architecture, and the Susquehanna River. She employs surface design techniques including cyanotype, monoprinting, digital image transfer, and needle felting as the basis for works that also incorporate hand painted fabrics, hand and machine stitching, and beadwork.

She was one of the first group of artists involved in the fiber art postcard phenomenon and was interviewed about this topic for the "Quilters' S.O.S. - Save Our Stories" project for the Alliance For American Quilts. The transcription and photographs are archived by the American Folklife Center at the Library of Congress.

== Notable works ==
- "Squirrel and Locust", awarded Best in Show 2012 "Art Quilts XVII: Integrating a Paradox" at the Chandler Center for the Arts
- "The Organic Garden", displayed by the United States Department of State in the U.S. Embassy in Laos from 2011–2013
- "The Organic Landscape" and "On The Verge", displayed in the U.S. Embassy in Papua New Guinea from 2024–2027
- "Late Summer Roses" and "In Dreams I Went Fishing" displayed in the U.S. Embassy in Astana, Kazakhstan from 2026-2029
- "Silk Mill #3", winner of the 2013 "Art of the State" Pennsylvania Museum Purchase Award and part of the Permanent Collection of the State Museum of Pennsylvania
- "In Dreams I Learned to Swim", juried into the 2015 Art of the State show
- "Luminosity" - In 2016, Reno was chosen by NASA to visit the Goddard Space Flight Center to view the James Webb Space Telescope, and to produce a unique piece of art. It was displayed at the Goddard Space Flight Center for three months in 2017.
- "In Dreams I Saw the Rift", awarded 2nd Place for Craft at the 2020 "Art of the State" Pennsylvania Museum exhibit.

== Media ==
=== TV, video, DVD, downloads ===
Quilting Arts Workshop: Surface Design Essentials for the Printed Quilt - an instructional course released in 2014, teaching four distinct surface design techniques: Thermofax, cyanotype, collagraph, and heliographic sun printing.

Reno is featured in three episodes of the PBS series Quilting Arts (episodes 1404, 1408, 1410).

HGTV Home and Garden Television - A sampling of Reno's techniques are demonstrated in a Simply Quilts show in the episode "Abstract Quilts from Nature".

=== Web ===
Studio Art Quilt Associates (SAQA) - Reno is interviewed as a featured artist in the article "Capturing the light, reflecting nature by Cindy Grisdela".

=== Publications ===
The piece "Tall Blue Lettuce" was on the cover of Professional Quilter Magazine. Other publications have showcased her work including Machine Quilting Unlimited, Quilter's Newsletter, and the book Beginner's Guide to Art Quilts.

She was featured in the March 2014 issue of American Quilter Magazine with an extensive interview “The Hand of the Maker” by Marjorie L. Russell and the article “Cognitive Textile Artist Process", written by Sue, which breaks her cognitive process down into steps that other artists and aspiring artists could find useful, regardless of their subject matter or preferred techniques.

Her piece "Jack in the Pulpit" was featured on the cover of the September 2015 issue of Machine Quilting Unlimited, along with a feature article written by Reno titled "Environmental Explorations". Her article, "Working with Wet Cyanotype" was featured in the January/February 2018 issue of Machine Quilting Unlimited. Reno's work is also featured in the June 2026 Issue of Quilting Arts Magazine alongside a companion video providing additional information

== Exhibits ==
Her fiber art has been hung in many juried shows including the International Quilt Festival, Quilts=Arts=Quilts at Schweinfurth Art Center, Art Quilts XIII: Lucky Break at the Chandler Center for the Arts, and in museums including the State Museum of Pennsylvania, the Museum of Fine Arts in Bishkek, Kyrgyzstan, the International Museum of Collage, Assemblage and Construction, the Bellefonte Museum, the Robeson Gallery of Pennsylvania State University and Materials Hard and Soft. In 2010, her solo exhibit, "Transformation: The Watt & Shand Series", received critical acclaim for the chronicling of the transformation of an historic department store into the Lancaster County Convention Center. In 2010, she unveiled a series titled "Flora and Fauna". 2012 brought new pieces titled "Ginger" and "Bamboo Emerging" into "The Garden" series and additional work in "The Structures" series of various pieces featuring the Columbia, PA Silk Mill. Best in Show was awarded for "Squirrel and Locust" in November, 2012 at Integrating a Paradox: Art Quilts XVII at Chandler Center for the Arts. 2013-2017 featured many additional exhibits. For example in 2016, her work was displayed in Tainan City, Taiwan; in 2017, at NASA's Goddard Space Flight Center in Greenbelt, MD and in 2022, at NASA's Unfolding the Universe : A James Webb Space Telescope VR Experience.

== Education ==
Reno attended Franklin & Marshall College in Lancaster, PA, pursuing a degree in Religious Studies.

== Associations ==
Reno is a Juried Artist Member of Studio Art Quilt Associates (SAQA), which features her work. She is a member of the Fiber Arts Guild of Pennsylvania and of the Surface Design Association.

She was a former Master Artisan in the Pennsylvania Guild of Craftsmen. She was an active member of the PA Arts Experience for 10 years until its dissolution in 2017.

== Family and personal life ==
Reno was born in Pennsylvania and is married to Wayne Reno. They have two daughters, Stella Sexton and Alice Petrovich. She is an avid gardener, hiker, biker and photographer.
