= Live in New Orleans (Maze album) =

Live album by Maze
- Released: January 9, 1981
- Recorded: Live: November 14–15, 1980 at Saenger Theatre, New Orleans; Studio: 1980–1981 at The Automatt, San Francisco
- Genres: Soul, funk
- Length: 82:17
- Label: Capitol
- Producer: Frankie Beverly

Maze chronology
Joy and Pain (1980)	Live in New Orleans (1981)	We Are One (1983)

Live in New Orleans is the first live album and fifth overall album by Bay Area-based R&B group Maze. It was recorded live at Saenger Theatre in New Orleans, Louisiana, November 14–15, 1980, with four new tracks recorded at the Automatt in San Francisco, California.

Professional ratings
Review scores
Source	Rating
AllMusic	4/5 stars

== Track listing ==
All songs written by Frankie Beverly.

1. "Introduction" - 0:30
2. "You" - 5:54
3. "Changing Times" - 5:11
4. "Joy and Pain" - 9:45
5. "Happy Feelings" - 5:28
6. "Southern Girl" - 6:22
7. "Look at California" - 11:00
8. "Feel That You're Feelin'" - 9:48
9. "The Look in Your Eyes" - 7:22
10. "Running Away" - 5:56
11. "Before I Let Go" - 5:07
12. "We Need Love to Live" - 4:50
13. "Reason" - 5:04
- "Running Away", "Before I Let Go", "We Need Love to Live", and "Reason" are studio tracks. The original 2-LP set contained 13 tracks. When it was issued on CD, it was amended to fit on one CD. Therefore, "Introduction", "You", and "Happy Feelings" were omitted from the CD version.

== Charts ==
Year	Album	Chart positions	
Year	Album	US	US R&B
1981	Live in New Orleans	34	3

=== Singles ===
Year	Single	Chart positions		
Year	Single	US	US R&B	US Dance
1981	"Before I Let Go"	—	13	—
1981	"Running Away"	—	7	—
1982	"We Need Love To Live"	—	29	—
