= Seattle Chamber Music Society =

American organization of musicians

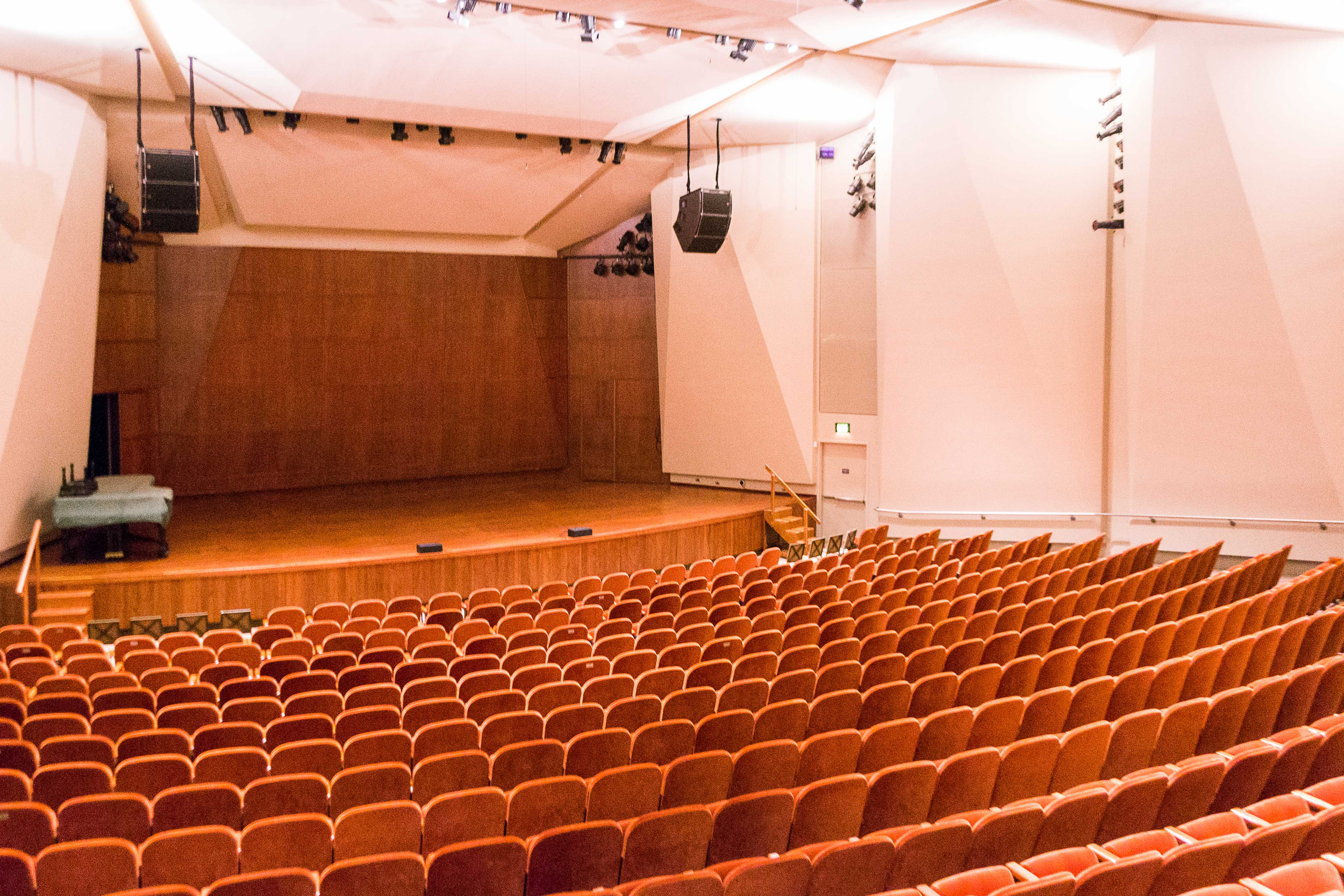
- Benaroya Concert Hall
- Formation: 1982; 44 years ago
- Type: chamber music
- Location: Seattle, Washington
- Artistic Director: James Ehnes
- Website: www.seattlechambermusic.org

The Seattle Chamber Music Society (SCMS) is a chamber music festival located in Seattle, Washington that is dedicated to the performance and promotion of chamber music. Established in 1982, the presenting organization is currently in its 43rd Anniversary Season. Originally the organization presented a series of summer concerts during the month of July at the Lakeside School. However, in 1999 the organization added a series of winter concerts during the month of January at Benaroya Hall in downtown Seattle. In 2005 they expanded their summer series to include further performances during the month of August at The Overlake School in addition to the July performances. In the fall of 2021, SCMS opened the Center for Chamber Music in downtown Seattle on 6th Avenue and Union Street. The new hall features the Dr. Kennan Hollingsworth Living Room which serves as a 70 seats recital hall, as well as office and event space.

SCMS was founded by Toby Saks, a cellist and music professor at the University of Washington, who served as artistic director until she handed over to Grammy Award-winning violinist James Ehnes about a year before her death on August 1, 2013. Ehnes had been associate artistic director since 2008, and John Holloway has been executive director since 2021.

== Artists ==
In addition to artistic director James Ehnes, recent performers with the organization include violinists Augustin Hadelich, Amy Schwartz Morreti, Tessa Lark, Benjamin Beilman, Arnaud Sussmann; violists Richard O'Neill, Matthew Lipman, Milena Pajaro-van de Stadt, Cynthia Phelps; cellists Edward Arron, Robert deMaine, Ani Aznavoorian, Alisa Weilerstein; Ronald Thomas; pianists Inon Barnatan, Marc Andre-Hamelin, Adam Neiman, Andrew Armstrong, Jeremy Denk.

The Society hosts more than sixty artists each season who also boast impressive careers, with the Seattle Times describing them as "the equivalent of an all-star lineup. A dream team of chamber players."

In 2025, SCMS contracted the acclaimed Balourdet Quartet to be its first ever Quartet-in-Residence, from September 2025 to May 2026. In addition to formal concerts, the quartet will engage in community events, outreach initiatives, masterclasses, and coaching students from the SCMS Youth Academy.

In 2025, SCMS acquired the traveling music venue The Concert Truck to be a component of its community outreach portfolio. The mobile concert hall enables open-air chamber performances to be held anywhere a truck can be parked.

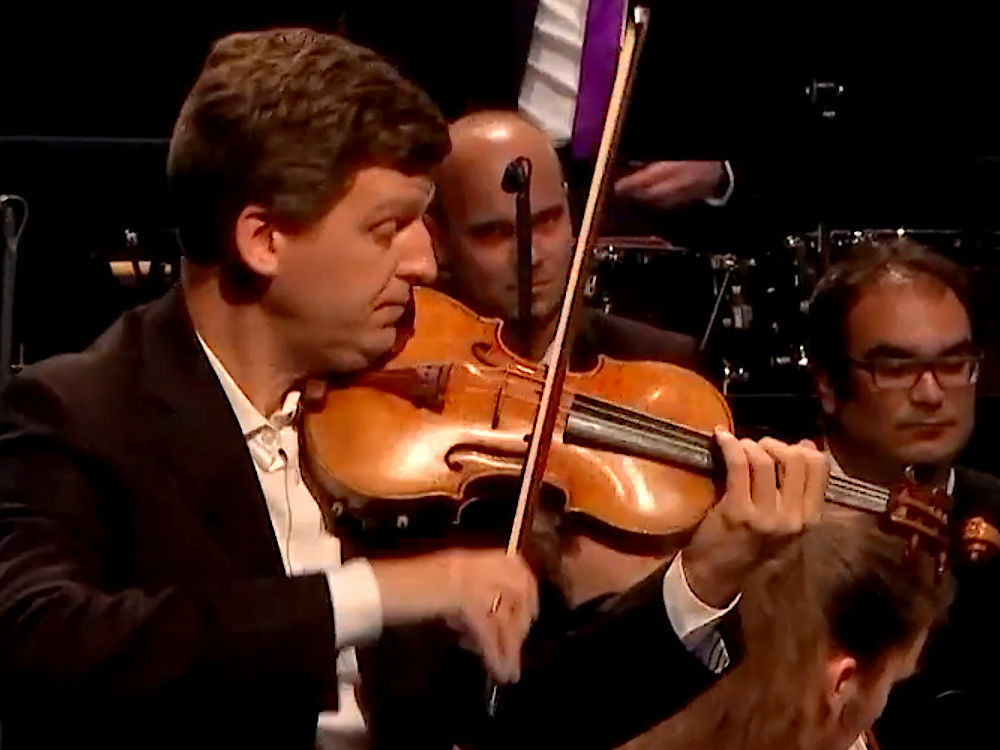
James Ehnes

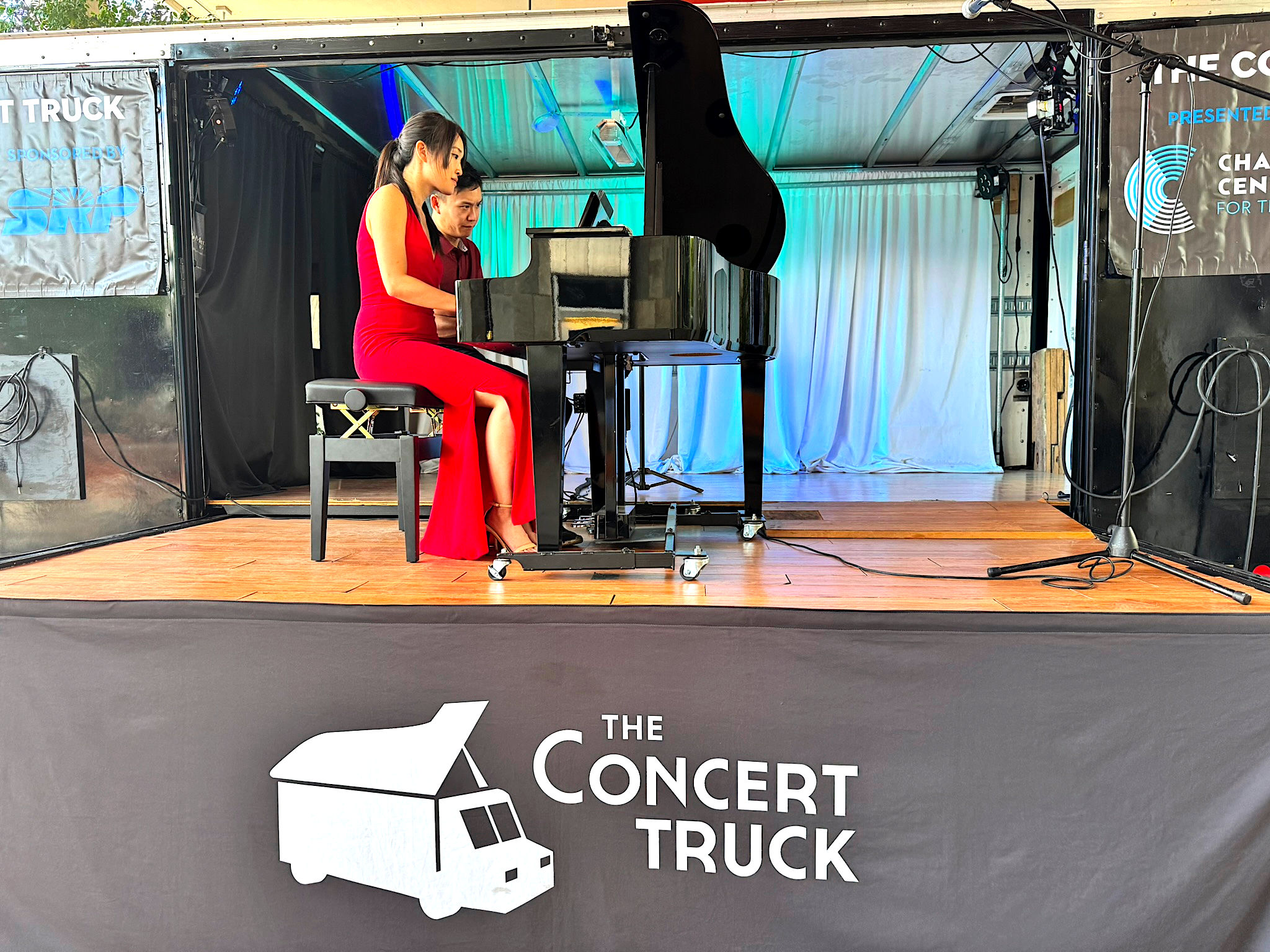
The Concert Truck
