= We Are One (Maze album) =

Studio album by Maze
- Released: 1983
- Recorded: 1982–83
- Studio: The Automatt, San Francisco, California
- Genre: Soul, funk
- Length: 39:44
- Label: Capitol
- Producer: Frankie Beverly

Maze chronology
Live in New Orleans (1981)	We Are One (1983)	Can't Stop the Love (1985)

Professional ratings
Review scores
Source	Rating
AllMusic	4/5 stars
The Rolling Stone Album Guide	3/5 stars
Smash Hits	8/10

We Are One is the fifth studio album and sixth overall album by Bay Area-based R&B group Maze. It was released in 1983 on Capitol Records.

== Track listing ==
All songs written by Frankie Beverly.

1. "Love Is the Key" 4:26
2. "Right on Time" 6:11
3. "Your Own Kind of Way" 5:13
4. "I Wanna Thank You" 5:26
5. "We Are One" 6:30
6. "Never Let You Down" 5:21
7. "I Love You Too Much" 6:13
8. "Metropolis" 0:43

== Charts ==
Year	Album	Chart positions		
Year	Album	US	US R&B	UK
1983	We Are One	25	5	38

=== Singles ===
Year	Single	Chart positions		
Year	Single	US	US R&B	UK
1983	"Love Is the Key"	80	5	88
1983	"Never Let You Down"	—	26	—
1983	"We Are One"	—	47	86
1983	"I Wanna Thank You"	—	59	—
