= Toby Saks =

American cellist (1942–2013)

- Born: January 8, 1942; New York City, New York, U.S.
- Died: August 1, 2013 (aged 71) Seattle, Washington, U.S.
- Occupations: Founder and Artistic Director of Seattle Chamber Music Society; New York Philharmonic
- Instrument: Cello

Toby Saks (January 8, 1942 – August 1, 2013) was an American cellist. She was the founder of the Seattle Chamber Music Society and a member of the New York Philharmonic.

== Early life and education ==
Born in New York City to an immigrant family, Saks began music lessons at the age of five, first on the piano and then, at age nine, on the cello. She studied at New York's High School of Performing Arts and later at the Juilliard School with Leonard Rose. She gave prize-winning performances at the International Tchaikovsky Competition in Moscow and the Casals Competition in Israel. In 1964, she won a Young Concert Artists award.

== Career ==
In 1971, she joined the New York Philharmonic, one of the first women to do so. However, over the years, Saks grew to dislike playing in an orchestra and, in 1976, accepted a faculty position in the University of Washington's music department, where she replaced the retiring Eva Heinitz.

In 1982, Saks said that she missed performing publicly and that Seattle lacked a major outlet for classical music performers. In response, Saks founded the Seattle Chamber Music Society, which hosts summer festivals that feature some forty artists every season. During her thirty-year career as artistic director of the society, Saks hired some 266 artists, many of whom were housed by Saks and her immediate neighbors. In 2012 Saks chose her replacement. He was James Ehnes, a former festival artist.

== Personal life ==
In the late 1960s, Saks married philosopher and author David Berlinski and had two children, daughter Claire (born 1968) and son Mischa (born 1973), both of whom are published authors. Saks and Berlinski later divorced.

In 2013, Saks was diagnosed with pancreatic cancer after persistent abdominal problems. Hoping to attend the society's festival, she chose to forgo treatment and, on August 1, died at the age of 71. She was survived by her husband of 25 years, Martin Greene, and her two children.

Saks was the elder sister of record producer Jay David Saks.
