= Good Life (Ledisi album) =

Studio album by Ledisi
- Released: March 15, 2024
- Recorded: 2023
- Genres: R&B, soul
- Length: 48:53
- Label: Listen Back Entertainment
- Producers: Ledisi; Darhyl Camper; G.A.D.; Cory Henry; Ray Keys; Shoji; Rex Rideout

Ledisi chronology
| Ledisi Sings Nina (2021) | Good Life (2024) | The Crown (2025) |

Singles from Good Life
- 1. "Sell Me No Dreams" Released: November 28, 2023; 2. "Perfect Stranger" Released: February 2, 2024

Good Life is the eleventh studio album by American singer and songwriter Ledisi. It was released on March 15, 2024, by Listen Back Entertainment, and distributed by BMG Rights Management.

== Background ==
After the release of Ledisi's previous album, Ledisi Sings Nina (2021), she took a brief hiatus from music to further her acting career. She starred in the lead role of portraying American gospel singer Mahalia Jackson in the American biographical musical film Remember Me: The Mahalia Jackson Story (2022), reprising the role from the earlier historical film Selma (2014). In 2023, she portrayed American singer Gladys Knight in the biographical drama film Spinning Gold. In February 2023, Ledisi co-headlined the Soul II Soul Tour with American singer Kem. Before embarking on the tour, Ledisi recorded a new single titled "I Need to Know" for the tour as she did not want to tour without a new single. The Soul II Soul Tour played twenty-three dates and concluded in May 2023.

== Recording and production ==
Record sessions for the album were meant to start in 2022 but were halted due to the success of her previous album, Ledisi Sings Nina, as well as the filming of Remember Me: The Mahalia Jackson Story where Ledisi portrays American gospel singer Mahalia Jackson. At the beginning of recording sessions, she didn't know which musical direction to take for album. In an interview with BET, Ledisi recounted "I had some stuff written but I didn't know what direction I wanted to go. I was moving and I didn't have anything interesting in my personal life to sing about." She began working with songwriters and producers Darhyl Camper, Ray Keys, and longtime collaborative partner Rex Rideout. Two female songwriters, Marsha Ambrosius and Francesca Richard, who helped structure the album were also part of the team. She also worked with projection and newcomers G.A.D. and Shoji. Ledisi co-wrote all of the songs on the album. During the recording of "Perfect Stranger", Ledisi's husband Ronald T. Young encouraged her to add American singer Kenny Lattimore to the record.

== Release and promotion ==
In collaboration with BMG Rights Management, Good Life was released by Ledisi's record label Listen Back Entertainment on March 15, 2024. Good Life is the fourth album to be released on Listen Back Entertainment. To promote Good Life, Ledisi appeared on various television shows from early-2023 to mid-2024. She debuted the single "I Need to Know" on The Jennifer Hudson Show on February 1, 2023. On March 12, 2024, she performed the album's lead single "Sell Me No Dreams" on The Tamron Hall Show. In March 2024, Ledisi embarked on The Good Life Tour. The tour began on March 6, 2024, at the Appell Center for the Performing Arts in York, Pennsylvania.

=== Singles ===
"I Need to Know" was the first single to be released on January 12, 2023. The song was recorded for Ledisi to have new music to perform during the Soul II Soul Tour. The song peaked atop of Billboard's Adult R&B Songs chart on May 25, 2023. It held the top position for two weeks, making it her second song to achieve this. The accompanying lyric video was released to YouTube on January 12, 2023.

"Sell Me No Dreams" was released as the album's lead single on November 28, 2023. The song rose to number 47 on Billboard's Hot R&B/Hip-Hop Songs chart and number 18 on the Adult R&B Songs chart. The accompanying music video for "Sell Me No Dreams", directed by her husband Ron T. Young, was released on February 21, 2024.

"Perfect Stranger", featuring Kenny Lattimore, was released as the second single from Good Life on February 2, 2024. The accompanying music video for "Perfect Stranger", directed by Ron T. Young, was released on February 21, 2024.

== Critical reception ==
Professional ratings
Review scores
| Source | Rating |
|---|---|
| AllMusic | 4/5 stars |

Good Life received generally positive reviews from music critics. Andy Kellman of AllMusic praised Ledisi for "her smart choices for new collaborators which resulted in an album that further strengthens her body of work." Ebony magazine's Josh Baker referred to the album as "a powerful testimony, reflecting her journey of overcoming obstacles such as being told she wasn't pretty enough or would never make it." Baker also praises the album's theme of "a positive outlook while also addressing the theme of overcoming chaos." Keith Spera of The New Orleans Advocate simply called Good Life, "a throwback to the classic-sounding contemporary R&B and soul."

== Track listing ==
| No. | Title | Writer(s) | Producer(s) | Length |
|---|---|---|---|---|
| 1. | "Good Life" | Ledisi Young; Darhyl Camper | Camper | 3:03 |
| 2. | "Magic (Voila)" | Young; Rex Rideout; Marsha Ambrosius | Rideout | 3:15 |
| 3. | "I Need to Know" | Young; Rideout | Rideout | 4:00 |
| 4. | "Sell Me No Dreams" | Young; Francesca Richard; Guillaume Alexandre Delormeau; Jeffrey Brent Anderson; Philippe Mark | G.A.D.; Shoji | 3:08 |
| 5. | "Stay Here Tonight" | Young; Cornelio Austin | Austin | 2:57 |
| 6. | "Like It Was" | Young; Rideout; Ronnie Garrett | Rideout | 3:47 |
| 7. | "Perfect Stranger" (featuring Kenny Lattimore) | Young; Brittany B.; Lattimore; Rideout | Rideout | 3:51 |
| 8. | "Quality Time" (featuring Butcher Brown) | Young; Morgan Burrs; Corey Fonville; Devonne Harris; Tish Hyman; Marcus Tenney | Brown | 4:25 |
| 9. | "Keep U in Mind" | Young; Ray Keys; Terrell "Tre" Roper | Keys | 3:24 |
| 10. | "Choose Me" | Young; Cory Henry; Taron Lockett; Isaiah Sharkey; Burniss Travis | Henry | 4:42 |
| 11. | "Me & U Ain't Good" | Young; Camper | Camper | 3:46 |
| 12. | "Good Year" | Young; Dave Gutter; Eric Krasno; Jeremy Most | Rideout; Krasno; Most | 3:32 |
| 13. | "Hello Love" | Young; Richard; Matthew Rideout; Rex Rideout | Rideout | 5:03 |
| Total length: | | | | 48:53 |
