= I Need to Know (Ledisi song) =

2024 single by Ledisi

Single by Ledisi

from the album Good Life
- Released: January 12, 2023
- Recorded: 2022
- Genre: R&B
- Length: 4:00
- Label: Listen Back Entertainment
- Songwriters: Ledisi Young; Rex Rideout
- Producer: Rex Rideout

Ledisi singles chronology
"Home on Christmas" (2022)	"I Need to Know" (2023)	"The Knowing" (2023)

Lyric video
- "I Need to Know" on YouTube

"I Need to Know" is a song recorded by American singer-songwriter Ledisi, for her eleventh studio album Good Life (2024). It was released to music outlets on January 12, 2023, by her independent record label Listen Back Entertainment. The song was written by Ledisi and longtime collaborator and producer Rex Rideout, the latter of which produced the song.

"I Need to Know" was described by Ledisi as a song that tells "the story of a relationship in question and the need for resolution." "I Need to Know" topped the US Adult R&B Songs chart for two consecutive weeks.

== Background and release ==
In an interview with BET, Ledisi stated "I went on tour and I needed a song for the tour because I didn't want to go on tour without a new single." The song premiered on iHeartRadio on January 12, 2023. On the same day, the song was released to digital music outlet. "I Need to Know" marks Ledisi's first single release from her own studio album in two years, since "Feeling Good" released on Ledisi Sings Nina in 2022. Rebekah Gonzalez of American mass media outlet iHeartMedia praised Ledisi's "powerhouse vocals amid a drowsy R&B beat and lush harmonies".

== Commercial performance ==
"I Need to Know" debuted at number forty on the US Adult R&B Songs chart during the week of January 28, 2023. On its eighteenth week, the song moved from number three to the top of the chart on May 25, 2023. It held the top position for two weeks, making it her second song to achieve this along with her 2020 single "Anything for You". The song spent a total of twenty-five weeks on the chart. In week of February 11, 2023, "I Need to Know" entered the Hot R&B/Hip-Hop Airplay chart. After fifteen weeks on the chart, the song peaked at number twenty.

== Live performances ==
Ledisi first performed the song "I Need to Know" on The Jennifer Hudson Show on February 1, 2023. During the climax of the song, singer and talk show host Jennifer Hudson threw her shoe across the stage in excitement of Ledisi's performance. Ledisi also performed the song during The Soul II Soul Tour, which she co-headlined with American R&B singer Kem in February 2023. The song was included on the setlist of The Good Life Tour in 2024.

== Track listing ==
- Digital download
1. "I Need to Know"

== Personnel and credits ==
- Ledisi – vocals, vocal production
- Rex Rideout – production
- Erik Madrid – mixing
