= Before I Let Go =

1981 single by Maze

Single by Maze

from the album Live in New Orleans
- B-side: "Golden Time of the Day"
- Released: 1981
- Genre: R&B; soul; funk
- Length: 3:42 (7" edit); 5:07 (album version)
- Label: Capitol
- Songwriter: Frankie Beverly
- Producer: Frankie Beverly

Maze singles chronology
"Running Away" (1981)	"Before I Let Go" (1981)	"We Need Love to Live" (1982)

"Before I Let Go" is a song performed by American R&B band Maze, issued as the second single from the band's fifth album and first live album Live in New Orleans. Although Live in New Orleans is a live album, "Before I Let Go" appears on the album as a studio recording. Written and produced by lead singer Frankie Beverly, the song peaked at #13 on the Billboard R&B chart in 1981. The song has been noted for its enduring popularity in Black American culture as a staple of gatherings and parties. Essence placed the song fifth best on their list of the "50 Greatest R&B Songs of All Time".

Beyoncé covered the song for her 2019 film Homecoming, and it is the focus of a 2021 episode of Jenna Wortham and Wesley Morris's New York Times podcast, Still Processing.

== Production ==
According to Frankie Beverly, he had originally written the song as a ballad about his conflicted feelings for Delores Marie "D'Marie" Warren of Alton McClain and Destiny, who died in a car crash in 1985, while he was in love with her but in a relationship with another woman. After the rest of the band was introduced to it by Beverly, they changed the sound to be more uptempo as they rehearsed.

== Chart positions ==
Chart (1981–2016)	Peak position
US R&B Singles (Billboard)	13

== Beyoncé version ==
"Before I Let Go"

Song by Beyoncé

from the album Homecoming
- Released: April 17, 2019
- Recorded: 2018–2019
- Studio: NRG Recording Studios (Los Angeles, CA)
- Genre: R&B; trap
- Length: 4:00
- Label: Parkwood
- Songwriters: Frankie Beverly; Larry Blackmon; Tomi Jenkins; Beyoncé; Jerome Temple
- Producers: Frankie Beverly; Tay Keith; Beyoncé

Beyoncé covered the song for her 2019 film Homecoming, and included the cover on the accompanying live album. It also includes a sample of New Orleans bounce artist, DJ Jubilee, one of the pioneers of bounce music, recorded on Take Fo' Records. An interpolation of "Candy" by Cameo also runs throughout the song.

Beverly told Billboard that the cover was "one of the high points of (his) life... in a class of its own" and made him "feel bigger than ever! I feel like I have a huge smash out there."

=== Live performances ===
Beyoncé performed the song during her Renaissance World Tour and Cowboy Carter Tour. During the latter, a video performance of Maze is featured side by side with Beyoncé's as a tribute to Beverly, who died in September 2024.

=== Chart positions ===
==== Weekly charts ====
Chart (2019)	Peak position
Belgium (Ultratip Bubbling Under Flanders)	9
Ireland (IRMA)	71
Lithuania (AGATA)	47
Slovakia Singles Digital (ČNS IFPI)	90
Sweden (Sverigetopplistan)	73
UK Singles (Official Charts)	77
US Billboard Hot 100	65
US Hot R&B/Hip-Hop Songs (Billboard)	24
US R&B/Hip-Hop Airplay (Billboard)	5

==== Year-end charts ====
Chart (2019)	Position
US Hot R&B/Hip-Hop Songs (Billboard)	69

=== Certifications ===
Region	Certification	Certified units/sales
Brazil (Pro-Música Brasil)	Gold	20,000^{‡}
New Zealand (RMNZ)	Gold	15,000^{‡}
United States (RIAA)	Platinum	1,000,000^{‡}
^{‡} Sales+streaming figures based on certification alone.
