= Can't Stop the Love (album) =

Studio album by Maze
- Released: 1985
- Recorded: 1984–85
- Studios: Fantasy, Berkeley, California
- Genres: Soul, funk
- Length: 39:45
- Label: Capitol
- Producer: Frankie Beverly

Maze chronology
We Are One (1983)	Can't Stop the Love (1985)	Live in Los Angeles (1986)

Singles from Can't Stop the Love
- 1. "Back in Stride" Released: January 1985; 2. "Too Many Games" Released: May 1985; 3. "I Want to Feel I'm Wanted" Released: August 1985

Professional ratings
Review scores
Source	Rating
AllMusic	3/5 stars

Can't Stop the Love is the sixth studio album and seventh overall album by Bay Area-based R&B group Maze, released in 1985 on Capitol Records.

== Track listing ==
All songs written by Frankie Beverly, except where noted.

Side one
No.	Title	Length
1.	"Back in Stride"	7:02
2.	"Can't Stop the Love"	7:09
3.	"Reachin' Down Inside"	5:22

Side two
No.	Title	Writer(s)	Length
1.	"Too Many Games"		4:56
2.	"I Want to Feel I'm Wanted"		5:42
3.	"Magic"	Beverly; Robin Duhe	4:51
4.	"A Place in My Heart"		4:50

== Charts ==
Year	Chart positions		
Year	US	US R&B	UK
1985	45	1	41

=== Singles ===
Year	Single	Chart positions		
Year	Single	US	US R&B	UK
1985	"Back in Stride"	88	1	79
1985	"Too Many Games"	103	5	36
1985	"I Want to Feel I'm Wanted"	—	28	—

== See also ==
- List of number-one R&B albums of 1985 (U.S.)
