= Joy and Pain =

Studio album by Maze
- Released: July 18, 1980
- Recorded: 1979–80
- Studio: The Record Plant, Sausalito, California
- Genre: Soul, funk
- Length: 42:59
- Label: Capitol
- Producer: Frankie Beverly

Maze chronology
Inspiration (1979)	Joy and Pain (1980)	Live in New Orleans (1981)

Professional ratings
Review scores
Source	Rating
AllMusic	4.5/5 stars

Joy and Pain is the fourth album by Bay Area-based R&B group Maze, released on July 18, 1980, on Capitol Records. The album features the R&B hits "Southern Girl" and "The Look in Your Eyes," along with the title track, all of which remain staples on Urban radio stations.

A version of the title track by Donna Allen made the top 10 in the UK Singles Chart in 1989. Around the same time, Rob Base and DJ E-Z Rock scored an R&B chart hit with their song of the same name, which interpolates the chorus from Maze's song. The original Maze version was itself re-released in 1989 in the UK, becoming a minor hit there. In 2001, Count Basic covered the song on their album More Than The Best.

== Track listing ==
All songs were written by Frankie Beverly.

1. "Changin' Times" 6:34
2. "The Look in Your Eyes" 5:22
3. "Family" 5:08
4. "Roots" 5:06
5. "Joy and Pain" 7:30
6. "Southern Girl" 6:49
7. "Happiness" 6:46

== Personnel ==
- Frankie Beverly – vocals, piano, synthesizer, rhythm guitar
- Ron Smith – lead guitar
- Sam Porter – organ, electric piano, synthesizer
- Robin Duhe – bass
- Billy "Shoes" Johnson – drums
- Roame Lowry – backing vocals, percussion, congas
- McKinley Williams – percussion, backing vocals

Technical

- John Nowland – engineer
- Rick Sanchez – assistant engineer
- Ginny Pallante – mix engineer
- Dr. Cecil Hale – executive producer

== Charts ==
Year	Album	Chart positions	
Year	Album	US	US R&B
1980	Joy and Pain	31	5

=== Singles ===
Year	Single	Chart positions		
Year	Single	US	US R&B	US Dance
1980	"Southern Girl"	—	9	—
