= Can't Get Over You =

Single by Maze

from the album Silky Soul
- B-side: "Africa"
- Released: August 1989
- Length: 4:38
- Label: Warner Bros.
- Songwriter: Frankie Beverly
- Producer: Frankie Beverly

Maze singles chronology
"Joy and Pain" (1989)	"Can't Get Over You" (1989)	"Silky Soul" (1989)

"Can't Get Over You" is a 1989 single by Maze featuring Frankie Beverly. The single was the first release the group had in almost three years, as well as being their debut release on the Warner Bros. Records label. "Can't Get Over You" was the group's second and final number one on the Hot Black Singles chart.
