= The Concert Truck =

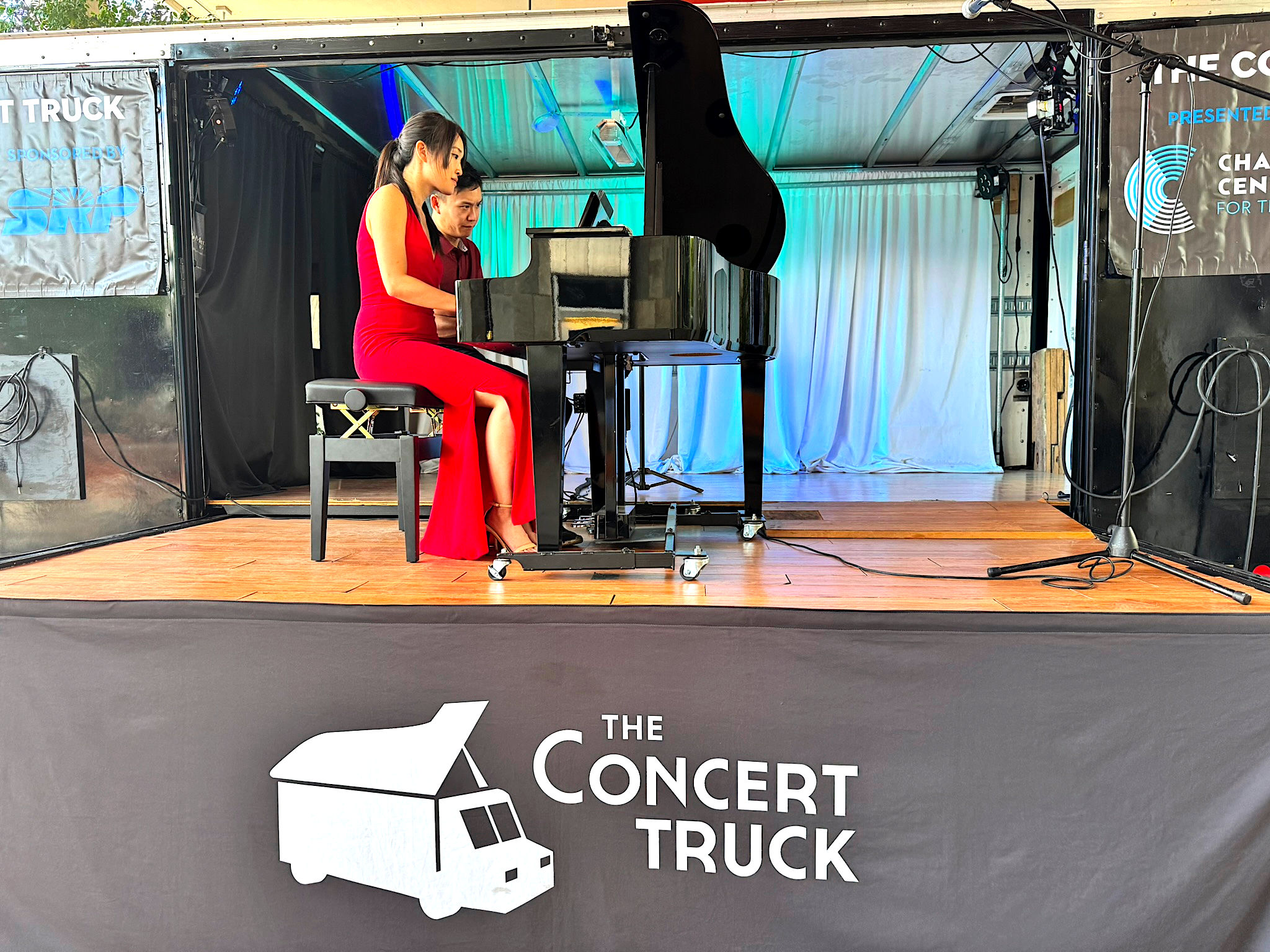
- Formation: 2016; 10 years ago
- Founded at: Columbia, South Carolina
- Type: Chamber Music
- Purpose: community outreach
- Region served: US
- Maryanne Tagney Director: Susan Zhang
- Website: www.theconcerttruck.org

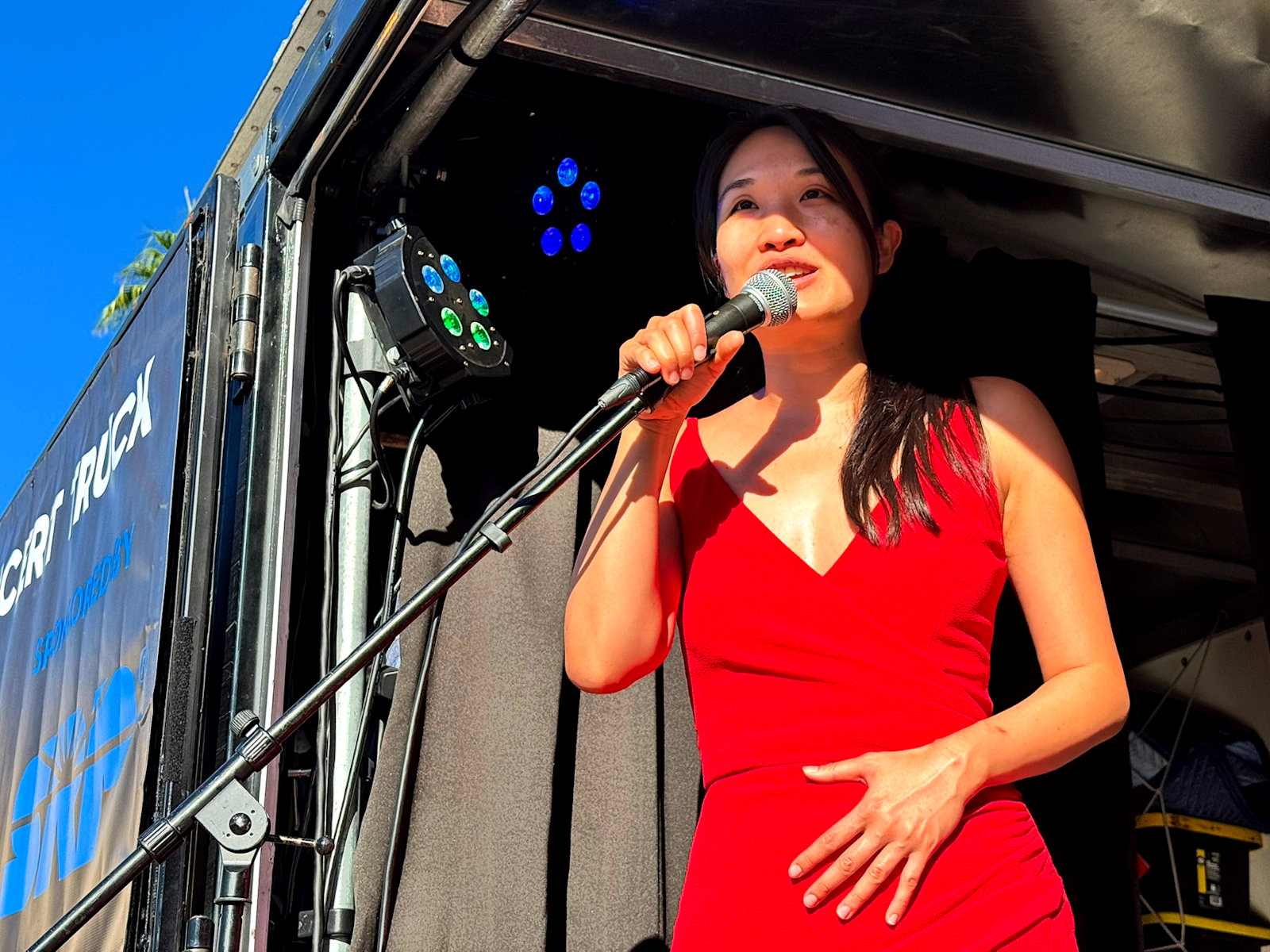
Susan Zhang

The Concert Truck (TCT) is an American organization focused on bringing chamber music into everyday spaces, including city neighborhoods, parks, and schools, usually in an outdoor setting.

Founded by Nick Luby and Susan Zhang in 2016, the namesake 16-foot truck is a traveling music venue outfitted with a grand piano, lights, sound system, and a retractable platform. The mobile concert hall enables live music to be performed anywhere a truck can be parked. TCT programs are often presented in partnership with local arts entities such as concert halls, symphony orchestras, festivals, schools, museums, radio and TV stations, etc.

During the COVID-19 pandemic, TCT's ability to perform outdoors offered an outlet for classical music when many indoor concerts were canceled. For example, its mobile stage was transformed into a Pop-Up Opera Truck used by the Washington National Opera for open-air performances when its home venue Kennedy Center was closed.

In 2025, TCT was acquired by Seattle Chamber Music Society to be a component of its community outreach portfolio.

== Awards ==
- 2015 University of South Carolina Music Leadership Laboratory: SPARK Creativity in Music Award
- 2018 Warnock Foundation: Social Innovation Fellowship
- 2018 Johns Hopkins University Business Plan Competition: Most Original Idea Award
