= Maze Featuring Frankie Beverly (album) =

Maze featuring Frankie Beverly

Studio album by Maze
- Released: 1977
- Recorded: 1977
- Studios: Pacific, Tacoma, Washington
- Genres: Soul, funk
- Length: 42:40
- Label: Capitol
- Producer: Frankie Beverly

Maze chronology
Maze featuring Frankie Beverly (1977)	Golden Time of Day (1978)

Maze featuring Frankie Beverly is the debut album by Bay Area-based R&B group Maze, released in 1977 on Capitol Records.

== Reception ==
Professional ratings
Review scores
Source	Rating
AllMusic	4.5/5 stars

Signed to a recording contract with Capitol Records in 1976, Maze would release their debut album, Maze featuring Frankie Beverly in 1977. From that album, Maze would earn a devoted fan base with classic tracks "Happy Feelin's", "While I'm Alone" and "Lady of Magic" ultimately giving them their first gold record. Their hit from the album, "Happy Feelin's", was included in CBS News's list of the 250 essential American songs of the past 250 years in June 2026, nearly 50 years after its release.

== Track listing ==
All tracks written by Frankie Beverly.

Side one
No.	Title	Length
1.	"Time Is on My Side"	5:19
2.	"Happy Feelin's"	7:10
3.	"Color Blind"	3:22
4.	"Lady of Magic"	4:45

Side two
No.	Title	Length
1.	"While I'm Alone"	4:35
2.	"You"	8:24
3.	"Look at California"	9:27

== Personnel ==
- Frankie Beverly - lead vocals, rhythm guitar
- Duane Thomas - lead guitar
- Robin Duhe - bass guitar
- Sam Porter - keyboards
- Joe Provost - drums
- McKinley "Bug" Williams - percussion, vocals
- Ronald "Roame" Lowry - congas, vocals

== Charts ==
=== Weekly charts ===
Chart (1977)	Peak position
US Billboard 200	52
US Top R&B/Hip-Hop Albums (Billboard)	6

=== Year-end charts ===
Chart (1977)	Position
US Billboard 200	57
US Top R&B/Hip-Hop Albums (Billboard)	16

=== Singles ===
Year	Single	Chart positions		
Year	Single	US	US R&B	US Dance
1977	"While I'm Alone"	89	21	—
