= The Good Life Tour =

2024 concert tour by Ledisi

- Tour by Ledisi
- Promotional poster for the tour
- Location: North America; Europe
- Associated album: Good Life
- Start date: March 6, 2024
- End date: June 22, 2024
- Legs: 2
- No. of shows: 33

Ledisi concert chronology
- The Soul II Soul Tour (2023); The Good Life Tour (2024); Love You Too Tour (2025)

The Good Life Tour was the twelfth concert tour by American singer Ledisi, in support of her eleventh studio album Good Life (2024).

== Background ==
In November 2023, Ledisi announced the tour via her Facebook account. Tickets were distributed through Ticketmaster. The US leg of the tour began on March 6 at the Appell Center for the Performing Arts in York, Pennsylvania. The US leg also stopped in Ledisi's home city New Orleans and finished at Connor Palace in Cleveland, Ohio on June 22, 2024.

== Critical reception ==
The tour received positive reviews from critics, who praised the tour for reviving R&B despite the narrative that "R&B was dead". Mya Abrabam of Vibe praised the show for being "the 'one thing' they were craving" which was "music they could relate to, dance to, sing along with, and get them to feel all the feelings and process them". Rolling Out writer Derrel Johnson praised the show as it "showcases Ledisi's stellar vocals".

== Opening act ==
- Raheem DeVaughn
- BJ the Chicago Kid

== Set list ==
1. "Alright"
2. "Add to Me"
3. "Good Life"
4. "I Need to Know"
5. "High"
6. "Think of You"
7. "Going Thru Changes"
8. "Sell Me No Dreams"
9. "Magic (Voila)"
10. "In the Morning"
11. "Hello Love"
12. "Anything for You"
13. "Perfect Stranger" (featuring David Michael Wyatt)
14. "Good Year"
15. "Pieces of Me"
16. "I Blame You"

== Tour dates ==
List of concerts showing date, city, country, venue and opening acts
Date	City	Country / Continent	Venue	Opening acts
March 6	York	United States	Appell Center for the Performing Arts	—N/a
March 7	Newark	United States	Prudential Hall	Raheem DeVaughn
March 8	Rochester	United States	The Theater at Innovation Square	Raheem DeVaughn
March 9	Philadelphia	United States	Metropolitan Opera House	—N/a
March 12	Boston	United States	Wilbur Theatre	—N/a
March 13	New Haven	United States	Shubert Theatre	—N/a
March 15	Oxon Hill	United States	Theater At MGM National Harbor	Raheem DeVaughn
March 16	Baltimore	United States	Lyric Baltimore	Raheem DeVaughn
March 17	Durham	United States	Durham Performing Arts Center	Raheem DeVaughn
March 19	Richmond	United States	Dominion Energy Center	Raheem DeVaughn
March 21	Charlotte	United States	Ovens Auditorium	Raheem DeVaughn
March 22	Louisville	United States	Palace Theatre	Raheem DeVaughn
March 23	St. Louis	United States	Stifel Theatre	Raheem DeVaughn
March 24	Nashville	United States	Ryman Auditorium	Raheem DeVaughn
March 26	Columbus	United States	Mershon Auditorium	Raheem DeVaughn
March 28	Indianapolis	United States	Old National Centre	Raheem DeVaughn
March 29	Detroit	United States	Fisher Theatre	BJ the Chicago Kid
March 30	Chicago	United States	Chicago Theatre	BJ the Chicago Kid
April 1	Atlanta	United States	Atlanta Symphony Hall	—N/a
April 3	Birmingham	United States	Alabama Theatre	Raheem DeVaughn
April 5	New Orleans	United States	Mahalia Jackson Theater of the Performing Arts	Raheem DeVaughn
April 6	Houston	United States	Bayou Music Center	Raheem DeVaughn
April 7	Dallas	United States	Music Hall at Fair Park	BJ the Chicago Kid
April 10	Fort Collins	United States	Lincoln Center	—N/a
April 12	Chandler	United States	Chandler Center for the Arts	—N/a
April 13	Inglewood	United States	YouTube Theater	Raheem DeVaughn
April 14	Oakland	United States	Fox Oakland Theatre	Raheem DeVaughn
April 25	Helsinki	Europe	Kulttuuritehdas Korjaamo April Jazz Festival	—N/a
April 26	Lahti	Europe	Sibelius Hall	—N/a
April 27	Kaunas	Europe	National Kaunas Drama Theatre	—N/a
April 28	Tallinn	Europe	Jaik	—N/a
April 30	Oslo	Europe	Cosmopolite Scene	—N/a
May 1	Rotterdam	Europe	LantarenVenster	—N/a
May 2	Paris	Europe	New Morning	—N/a
May 3	Birmingham	Europe	O2 Institute	—N/a
May 4	Manchester	Europe	Manchester Academy	—N/a
May 5	London	Europe	Electric Brixton	—N/a
June 15	Orlando	United States	Central Florida Fairgrounds	—N/a
June 22	Cleveland	United States	Connor Palace	—N/a

== Personnel ==
- Musical Director/Drums: Greg Clark Jr
- Bass: Antone "Chooky" Caldwell
- Keyboard: Joe Harley
- Guitar: Xavier Lynn
- Background vocalists: Sara Williams, David Michael Wyatt
