= This Bitter Earth =

1960 song by Clyde Otis

Single by Dinah Washington

from the album Unforgettable
- A-side: "I Understand"
- Released: 1960
- Recorded: 1959
- Genre: jazz, soul
- Length: 2:30
- Label: Mercury Records
- Songwriter: Clyde Otis

Dinah Washington singles chronology
"A Rockin' Good Way (to Mess Around and Fall in Love)" (1960)	"This Bitter Earth" (1960)	"Love Walked In" (1960)

"This Bitter Earth" is a 1960 song made famous by rhythm and blues singer Dinah Washington. Written and produced by Clyde Otis, it peaked to #1 on the U.S. R&B chart for the week of July 25, 1960, and also reached #24 on the U.S. pop chart.

== Charts ==
Chart (1960)	Peak position
US Billboard Hot 100	24
US Billboard Hot R&B Sides	1

== Ledisi version ==
"This Bitter Earth"

Single by Ledisi

from the album For Dinah
- Released: July 18, 2025
- Recorded: 2025
- Genre: jazz
- Length: 5:04
- Label: Listen Back Entertainment, Candid Records
- Songwriters: Clyde Otis, Lily Mars, Charles Kawasaki
- Producers: Ledisi, Christian McBride, Rex Rideout

Ledisi singles chronology
"BLKWMN" (2025)	"This Bitter Earth" (2025)

"This Bitter Earth" was recorded by American singer-songwriter Ledisi, for her thirteenth studio album For Dinah (2025).

=== Background and release ===
Following the conclusion of the Love You Too Tour, Ledisi announced her next album For Dinah; a tribute album to Dinah Washington to be released on October 3, 2025.

This song is so reflective of any era, especially in such a chaotic time as this. People need music right now, and this song is a beautiful sentiment depicting a longing for life being filled with love. When I hear Dinah, I hear that longing. It’s a perfect way to announce my tribute to The Queen of The Blues.

— Ledisi

On July 18, 2025, Ledisi released her version of "This Bitter Earth" as the lead single of the album.

=== Music video ===
While a formal music video was not filmed, an in-studio performance video, directed by Ron T. Young, was released to Ledisi's social media platforms. The video was shot in black-and-white and featured musicians Joe Harley on piano and Ronald "Cjay" Alexander on bass.

=== Credits and personnel ===
- Ledisi – vocals
- Christian McBride – bass, producer
- Michael King – piano
- McClenty Hunter Jr. – drums
- Sara Hewitt-Roth – cello
- Antoine Silverman – violin, viola
- Yuko Naito-Gotay – violin, viola
- Lisa Matricardi – violin, viola
- Rex Rideout – producer
- Todd Whitelock – mixer
- Rueben Cohen – mastering engineer

== Other recordings ==
- In 1964, Aretha Franklin released a version on her album Unforgettable: A Tribute to Dinah Washington for Columbia Records.
- In May 1970, The Satisfactions released a version, reaching #36 on the U.S. R&B charts.
- In 1973, Johnnie Taylor released a version on his album Taylored In Silk for Stax Records
- Miki Howard recorded a version that appears on her 1992 album, Femme Fatale.
- In 2004, break-core musician Venetian Snares used vocals from this song in his own composition with the same title on his mini-album Moonglow/This Bitter Earth.
- Gladys Knight recorded the song for her 2006 album Before Me.
- Deborah Cox recorded the song for her 2007 album Destination Moon.
- On June 10, 2010, the song featured in So You Think You Can Dance, in a routine choreographed by Mia Michaels.
- The song was featured on the soundtrack for the 2010 Martin Scorsese film Shutter Island, in the form of a mashup with Max Richter's "On the Nature of Daylight." In 2012, the mashup was featured as the accompanying track to the launch trailer of The Secret World, an MMORPG from developer Funcom, published by Electronic Arts. It was also used in the Christopher Wheeldon's dance Five Movements, Three Repeats. The pas de deux set to the mashup was added to New York City Ballet's repertory later that year. The track featured on Richter's 2018 double-album The Blue Notebooks: 15 Years Edition.
- Erykah Badu and Nas released "This Bitter Land," which featured on the soundtrack of Steven Caple Jr.'s 2016 film The Land.
- In 2021 Veronica Swift released her adaptation of the Max Richter arrangement of the song.

== Elsewhere in popular culture ==
- The song is a key piece in the 1978 film Killer of Sheep by director Charles Burnett.
- The song is featured in the closing scene of the 2014 French crime film La French, directed by Cédric Jimenez.
