= The Crown (Ledisi album) =

Studio album by Ledisi
- Released: April 25, 2025
- Recorded: 2024–2025
- Genre: R&B
- Length: 41:00
- Label: Listen Back Entertainment
- Producers: Ledisi; Rex Rideout; Darhyl Camper; Ray Keys; Jacques 'Joc' Pierre; Terrell Roper

Ledisi chronology
Good Life (2024)	The Crown (2025)	For Dinah (2025)

Singles from The Crown
- 1. "Love You Too" Released: January 31, 2025; 2. "BLKWMN" Released: February 21, 2025

The Crown is the twelfth studio album by American singer and songwriter Ledisi. It was released on April 25, 2025, by Listen Back Entertainment.

The album received a nomination for Best R&B Album at the 68th Annual Grammy Awards, marking Ledisi's fifth nomination in the category, while "Love You Too" received a nomination for Best Traditional R&B Performance.

== Background and development ==
After The Good Life Tour concluded in June 2024, Ledisi originally planned not record any new music. During an interview with The Roundtable with Robert Bannon, Ledisi expressed that although she did not plan to release new music, she recorded the song "Love You Too" in case she embarked on another concert tour. Record sessions for the album began in July 2024 after Ledisi received an invitation to perform at Super Bowl LIX. Wanting to capitalize on her then-upcoming performance at Super Bowl LIX, she began recording a new album with the goal of writing "two songs every other week". The album saw the return of her music production team Rex Rideout, Darhyl Camper, Ray Keys, and Jacques 'Joc' Pierre; all of whom worked with Ledisi on her previous album Good Life (2024). Ledisi co-wrote all of the songs on the album. She finished recording the album in January 2025.

Music producer Rex Rideout titled the album The Crown. In an interview with DeltaPlex News, Ledisi stated "[Rex said] Why are you afraid to call it The Crown? Go ahead and receive that position, that status, like, be that, you are that, it's OK. Then I started thinking about it: Oh, we all have a crown. The goal is to leave with that crown. Choosing what is heavy, is joyful, is life. A crown is your calling. So let's go ahead and own my calling."

== Composition ==
Variously classified as a R&B album, The Crown blends together various styles of music including soul, gospel, and dance music. The album also fuses in more contemporary musical styles, such as neo soul, trap, and pop.

== Promotion and release ==
On March 17, 2025, Ledisi appeared on the daytime talk show Sherri, hosted by Sherri Shepherd. During the televised appearance, Ledisi revealed the album cover art and the album's release date. On April 17, 2025, Ledisi revealed the track listing of the album via her Facebook. In collaboration with BMG Rights Management, The Crown was released by Ledisi's record label Listen Back Entertainment on April 25, 2025. The album was released first in digital download and online streaming format. On May 12, 2025, Ledisi appeared on The Kelly Clarkson Show and performed her song "7 Days of Weak". On June 9, 2025, Ledisi performed "BLKWMN" at the 2025 BET Awards. On June 12, 2025, The Crown was released in CD format.

=== Singles ===
"Love You Too" was released as the album's lead single on January 31, 2025. The song debuted at number 29 on Billboard's Adult R&B Songs chart on February 9, 2025, and peaked at number 14 on April 26, 2025, respectively. The accompanying music video was released to YouTube on January 31, 2025. In April 2025, "Love You Too" peaked at number fourteen on the Adult R&B Songs chart. On February 21, 2025, Ledisi released the single "BLKWMN".

=== Tour ===
On February 9, 2025, Ledisi performed "Lift Every Voice and Sing" during Super Bowl LIX, at the Caesars Superdome in New Orleans, Louisiana. On February 10, 2025, she announced her upcoming tour called the Love You Too Tour. The concert tour commenced on May 28, 2025, in Baltimore, Maryland, and concluded on June 29, 2025, in Savannah, Georgia.

She also embarked a European Tour which was separated into two different parts. The first part of the European Tour commenced on July 4, 2025, at the Rudolstadt-Festival in Germany. It concluded on July 19, 2025, in Kraków. The tour resumed on October 9, 2025, in London. On August 12, 2025, Ledisi announced the upcoming of her fourteenth concert tour The Crown Tour.

== Critical reception ==
Kandice Bell of This Is RNB characterized the album as being "about life that many can relate to. She's singing about real situations that happen in life. Ledisi talks about the highs and lows of love on the album." Rated R&B's Keithan Samuels called the album "a body of work that's as pure as 24 karats. And like the precious metal, each song had to be mined from within.

== Track listing ==
No.	Title	Writer(s)	Producer(s)	Length
1.	"Daydreaming"	Ledisi Young	Ray Keys; Terrell Roper
2.	"Love You Too"	Young; Rex Rideout	Rex Rideout
3.	"Enuf"	Young	Darhyl Camper; Ledisi Young
4.	"All 4 U"	Young	Rideout
5.	"Let Go"	Young	Rideout
6.	"BLKWMN"	Young; Jacques Pierre	Jacques Pierre; Rideout; Young
7.	"7 Days of Weak"	Pierre; Young	Jacques Pierre; Rideout; Young
8.	"Heaven"	Pierre; Young	Pierre
9.	"Making a Way"	Young	Ray Keys
10.	"I Do"	Young	Camper; Roper
11.	"The Crown" (featuring Trombone Shorty)	Young	Camper
Total length:				41:00

== Personnel ==
Adapted from The Crown liner notes

Musicians

- Ledisi – lead vocals, vocal production (all tracks)
- Darhyl Camper – production, keyboards (tracks 3, 10, 11)
- Camille Grisby – background vocals (tracks 1, 9, 11)
- Ray Keys – programming, keyboards, production, (track 1, 9)
- Jacques Pierre – programming, keyboards, production (tracks 6, 7, 8)
- George Potts – background vocals (tracks 1, 9, 11)
- Ethan Ridings – guitar (tracks 4, 5)
- Rex Rideout – production (tracks 2, 4, 6, 7), vocal recording engineer (all tracks), keyboards (tracks 4, 5)
- Terrell Roper – production (tracks 1, 10)
- Trombone Shorty – trombone
- Sara Williams – background vocals (tracks 1, 9, 11)

Technical

- Gene "The Dream" Grimaldi – mastering
- Sanjeevi Easwar – assistant mixing (all tracks; excluding track 2)
- Erik Madrid – mixing (all tracks)
