= Chandler Center for the Arts =

Arts center in Chandler, Arizona, US

Coordinates: 33°18′26″N 111°50′32″W

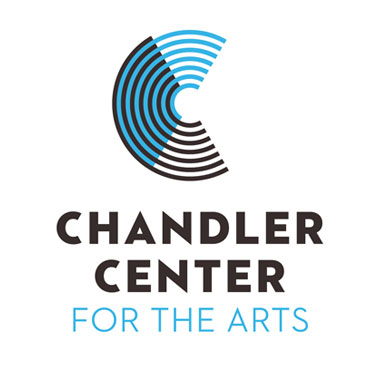

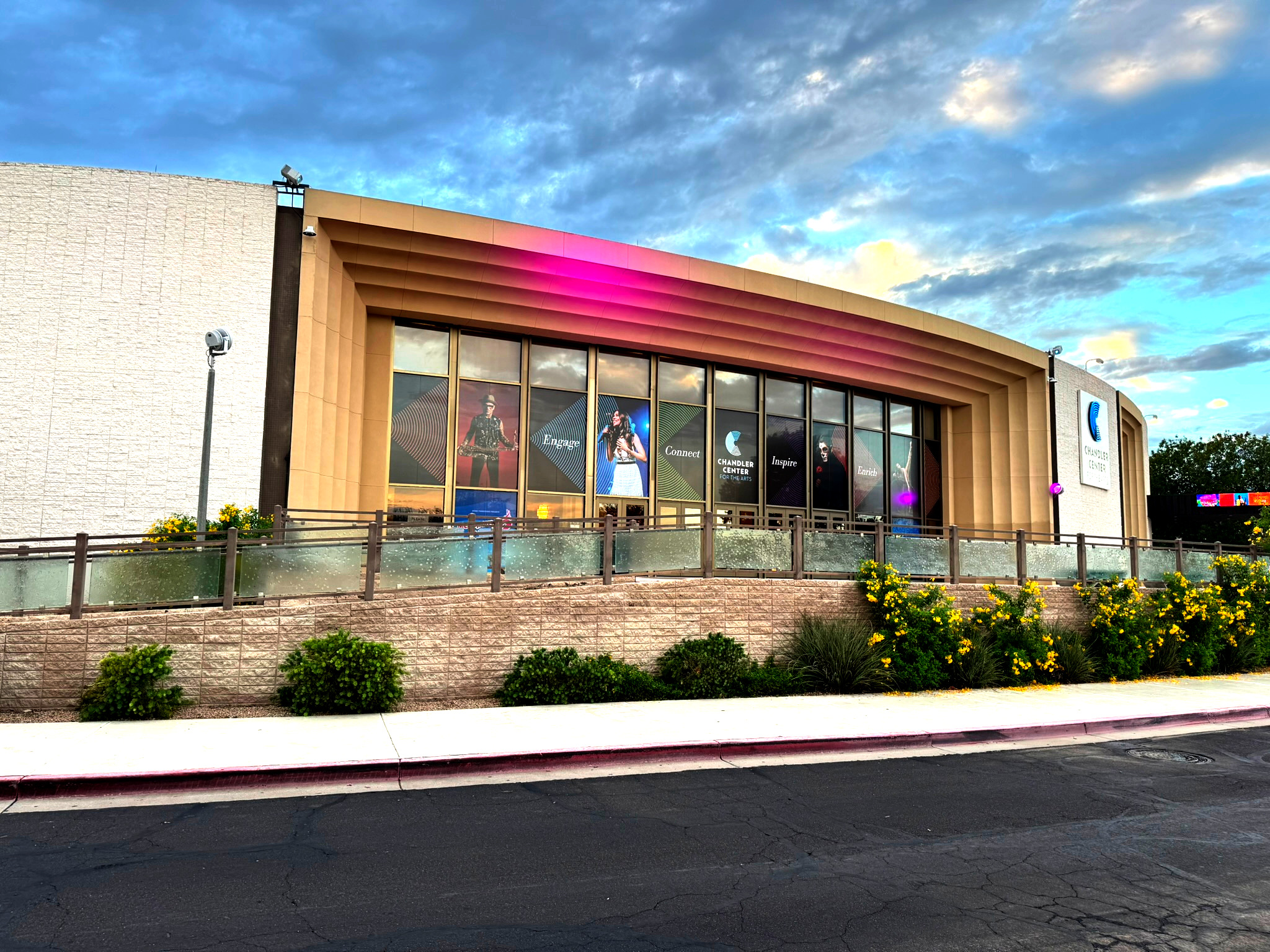
- Address: Chandler, Arizona, USA

Website
- www.chandlercenter.org

Chandler Center for the Arts (CCA), is located in Chandler, Arizona, and is jointly owned by the City of Chandler and the Chandler Unified School District. The Chandler Center for the Arts functions as the home theater for Chandler High School and the arts center for the City of Chandler. The Chandler Center for the Arts receives no direct appropriations for artistic programming. Any donations it receives must be applied only to the maintenance and operation of the actual building.

== Capacity ==
| Room | Capacity |
|---|---|
| Steena Murray Mainstage | 1,508 |
| Hal Bogle Theatre | 346 |
| Recital Hall | 246 |

The CCA is notable for its turntable divisible auditorium designed by architect Wendell Rossman. This design allows for the Hal Bogle Theatre and Recital Hall to be used as separate, intimate performance spaces that can alternately be rotated 180 degrees to face the mainstage, increasing seating capacity in the Steena Murray Mainstage.

== Galleries ==
The center's Exhibition Hall hosts free exhibits of visual arts in a variety of media and cultural origins.

The Vision Gallery is located in CCA, and features rotating displays by over 350 artists in such media as painting, watercolor, photography, mixed media, sculpture, ceramics, glass, textiles and metal.

== History ==
The City of Chandler created the Chandler Cultural Foundation in 1989 in order to create programming finance development for Chandler Center of the Arts. As the programming entity of CCA, the Chandler Cultural Foundation presents quality programs that would not otherwise be available in the community.

Today, Chandler Center for the Arts is a local resident and tourist attraction. With its proximity to Downtown Chandler, and the trending shows hosted at the complex, as well as sponsors for the CCA, it has received well, especially in recent years.

In 2019, Chandler Center for the Arts underwent a brand ident refresh, introducing the current cyan CCA logo (as pictured above). Some parts of the exterior complex were redone to reflect this new brand identity. The windows at the reception were also given a makeover.

Starting in 2024, CCA has sponsored an annual series of free concerts presented by the traveling music venue The Concert Truck, performing classical music in various local locations during October.

== Gallery ==
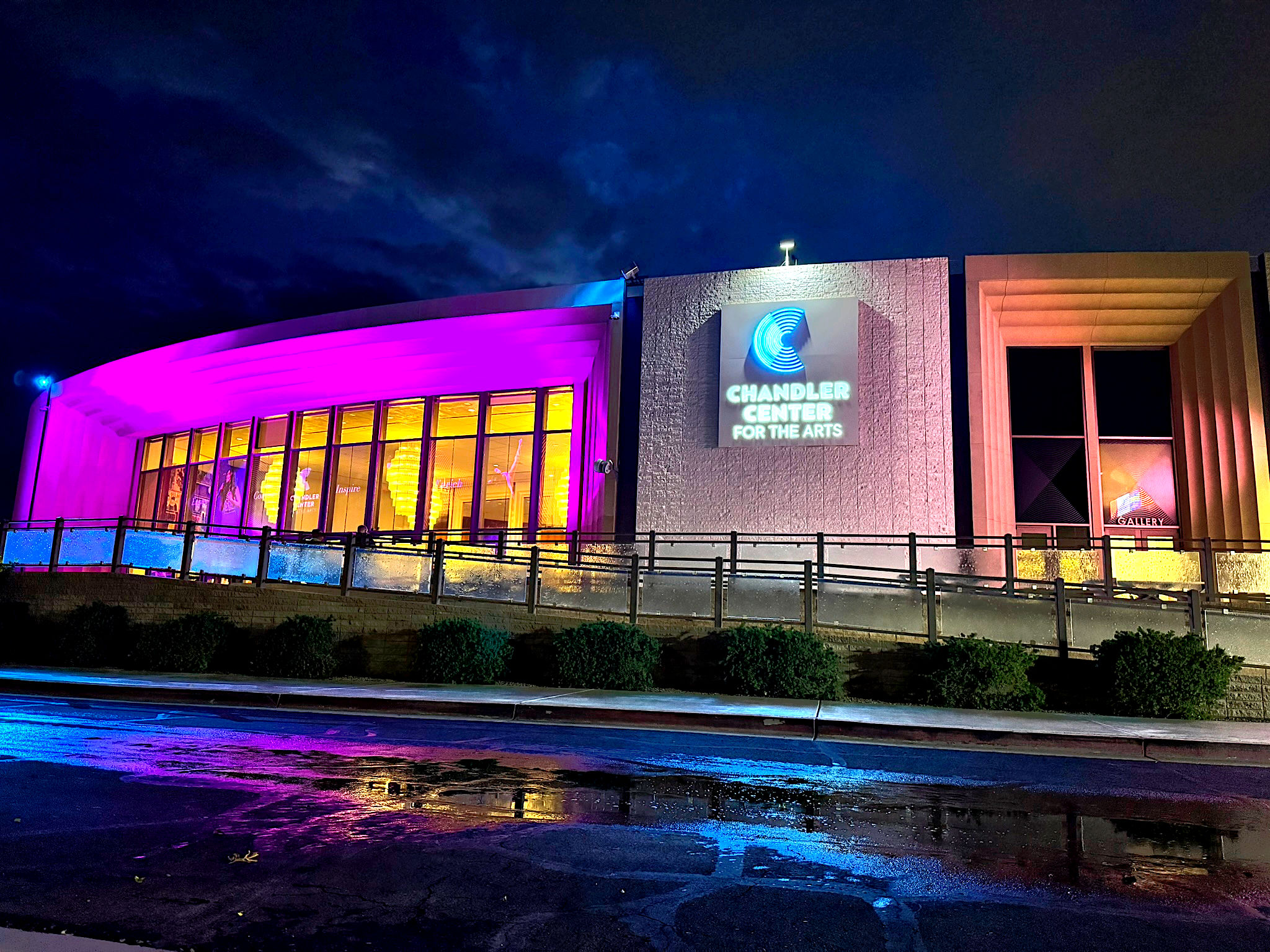
Front entrance at night

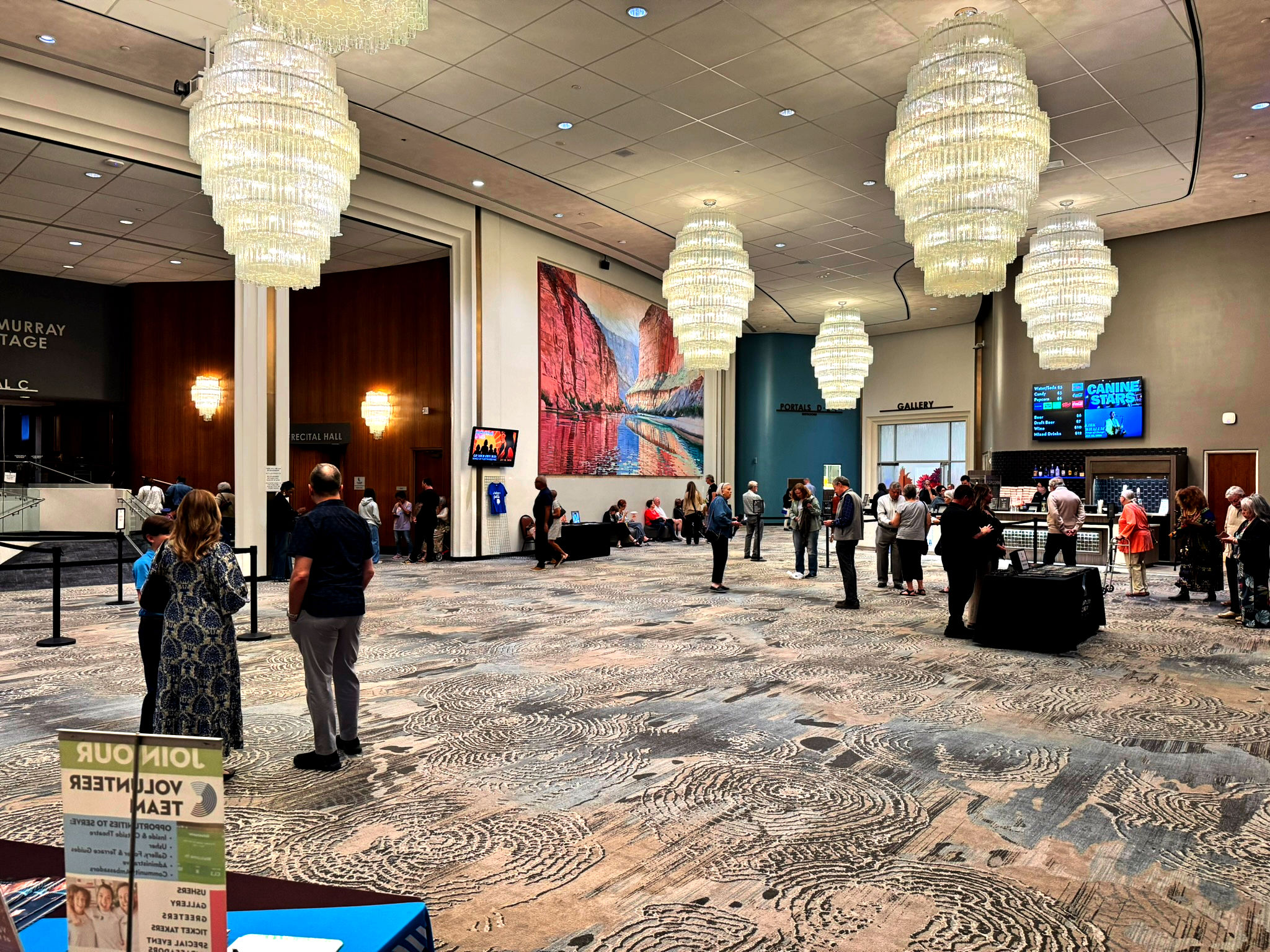
Main Lobby

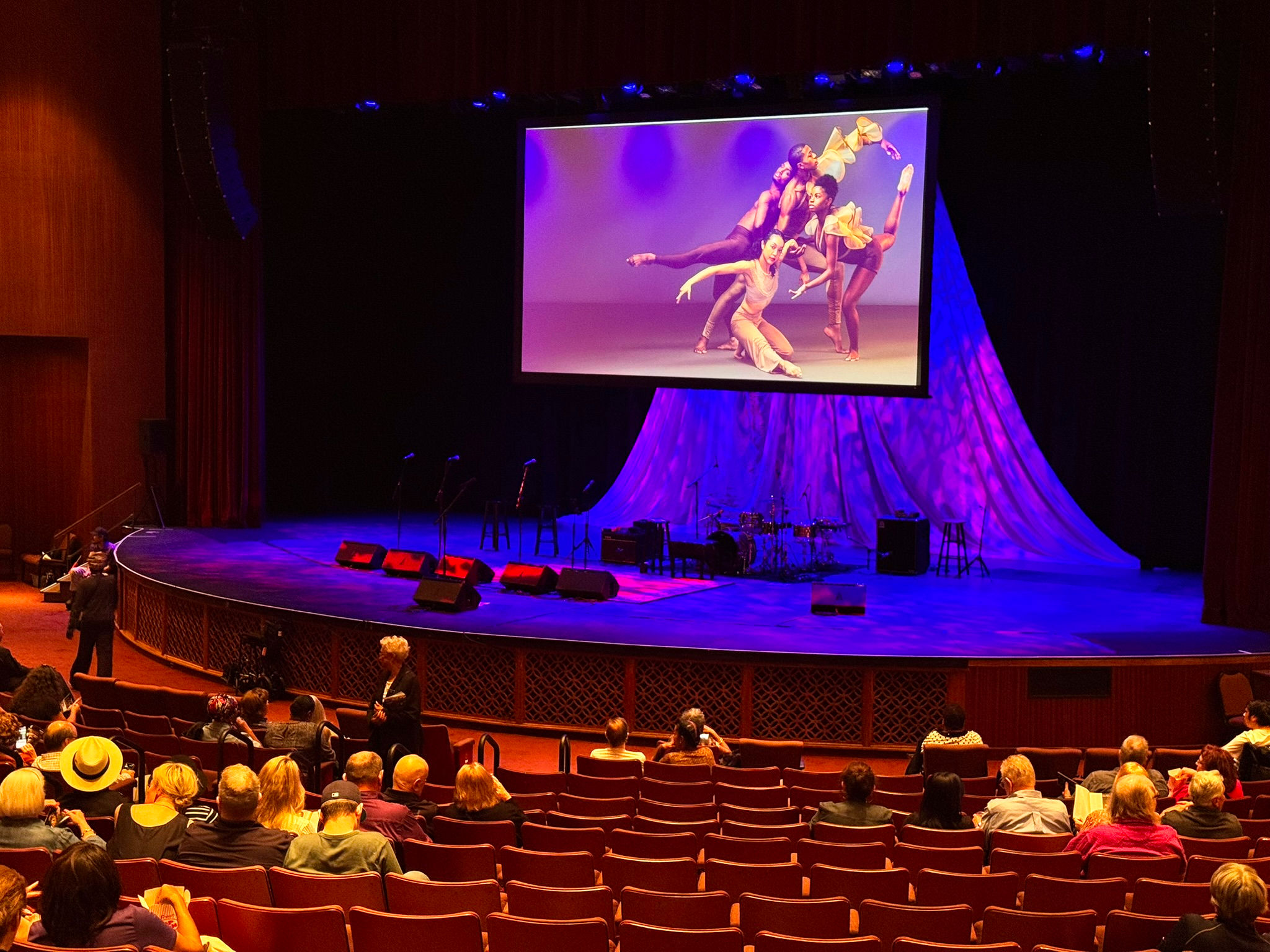
Steena Murray Mainstage

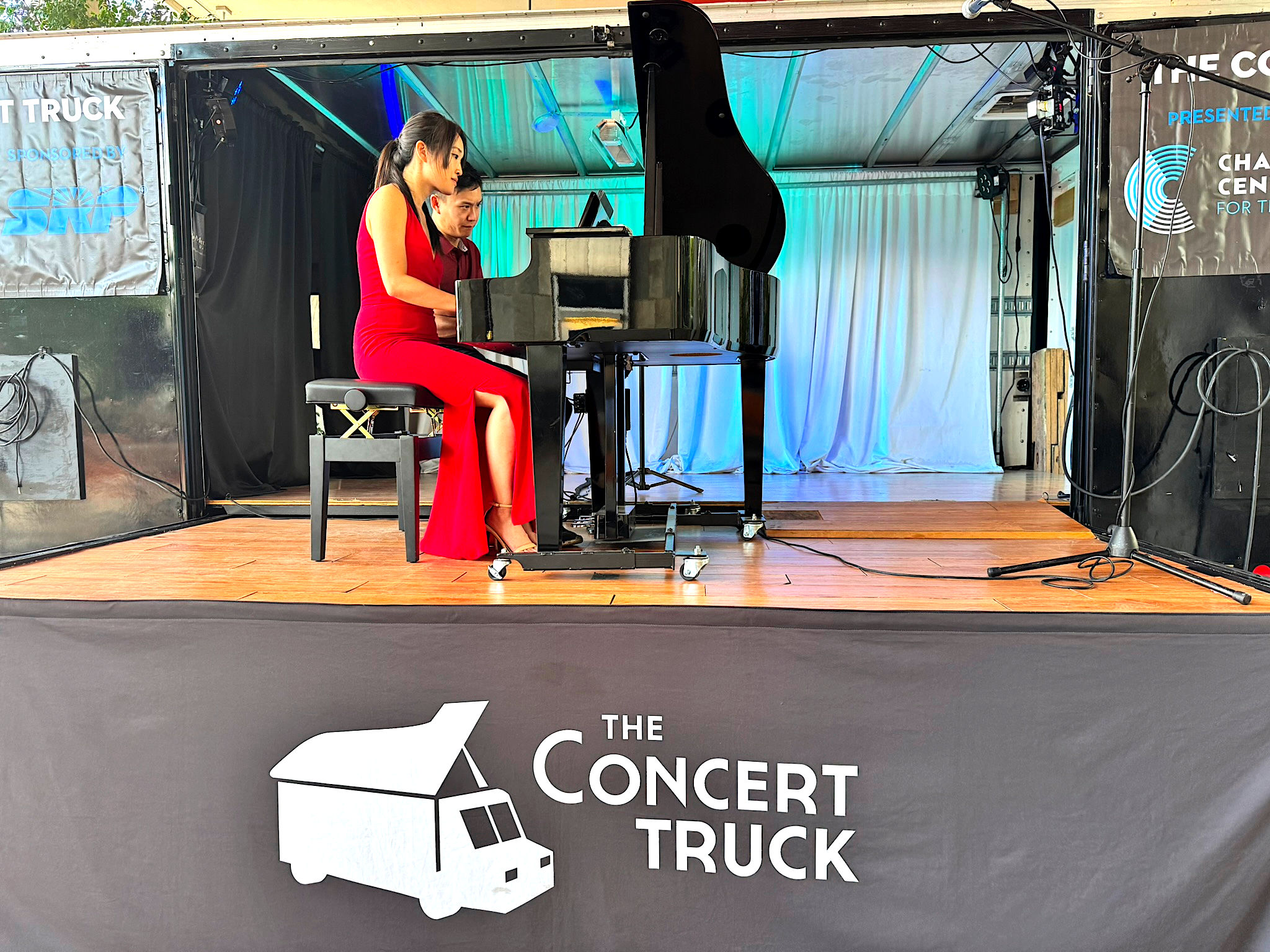
The Concert Truck
