= Maze (band) =

American soul band

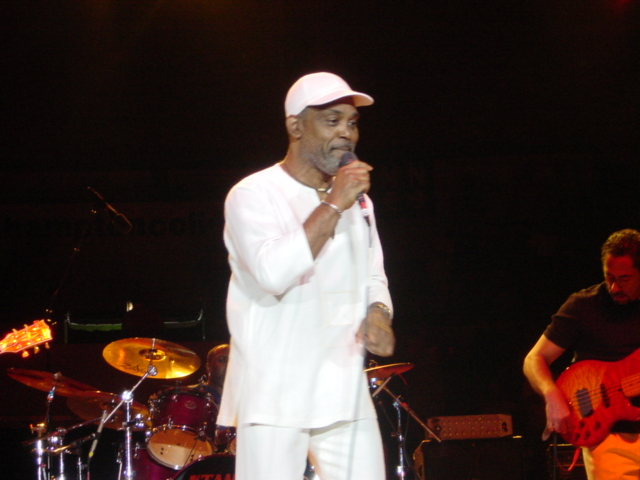
- Frankie Beverly of Maze performing in 2002

Background information
- Origin: Philadelphia, Pennsylvania, U.S.
- Genres: R&B, soul, funk
- Years active: 1970–present
- Labels: Capitol, Warner Bros.
- Members: Tony Lindsay; Carl Wheeler; Odeen Mays Jr. Vernon Black; Larry Wims; Kevin Lloyd; Kevin Stancil; Marlon Curry
- Past members: Frankie Beverly; Roame Lowery; Sam Porter; Robin Duhe; Wayne Thomas; Joe Provost; Ahaguna Sun; Ron Smith; Billy Johnson; Phillip Woo; Wayne "Ziggy" Lindsay; Vernon White; McKinley "Bug" Williams; William Bryant; John "Jubu" Smith; Vance Taylor; Larry "Bear Williams" Kimpel; Calvin Napper; Daniel Weatherspoon

Maze, also known as Maze Featuring Frankie Beverly and Frankie Beverly & Maze, is an American soul band founded by Frankie Beverly in Philadelphia in 1970. Under its original name Raw Soul, the band moved to San Francisco and was introduced to Marvin Gaye. Gaye took the group on the road with him as one of his opening acts, and in 1976, he suggested that they change their name from Raw Soul.

Maze released nine Gold albums from 1977 to 1993. Their well-known songs include "Happy Feelings," "While I'm Alone," "Golden Time of Day," “Southern Girl,” "The Look in Your Eyes," "Joy and Pain," "Before I Let Go," "We Are One," "Back in Stride," "Can't Get Over You" and "The Morning After."

== Career ==
Frankie Beverly started the band as Raw Soul in 1970. They recorded a couple of singles on the small Gregar label, but without any major hits. With a few personnel changes, a move from Philadelphia to the San Francisco Bay Area in 1971, and an introduction to Marvin Gaye, the band became an immediate success. Gaye took the band on the road with him as one of his curtain-raising acts, and in 1976, he suggested that they change their name from Raw Soul to something more appealing. And so, with a lot of back and forth throwing names around, founding member Roame came up with the name Maze.

Maze signed a recording contract with Capitol Records in 1976, and released their debut album, Maze featuring Frankie Beverly, in 1977. Hit singles from that album include "Happy Feelin's", "While I'm Alone", and "Lady of Magic", giving them their first gold record and earning Maze a devoted following. They had success with the albums Golden Time of Day (1978), Inspiration (1979), and Joy and Pain (1980). The group has said that their hit single “Southern Girl” was dedicated to all southern women from Virginia to Texas. Their next recording was Live in New Orleans, three quarters of which was recorded at the Saenger Theatre, on November 14–15, 1980. Three of those songs were on the US R&B chart, including "Running Away", "Before I Let Go", and "We Need Love to Live". By that time, the band had a reputation in America and enjoyed a following in the United Kingdom with promotional support from the British DJ Robbie Vincent. In May 1985, Maze sold out eight nights at the Hammersmith Odeon.

The band released their next album, Can't Stop the Love in March 1985, which featured the group's first number one R&B hit "Back In Stride." The Top 5 follow-up, "Too Many Games" was also featured on the album. The latter single became the band's biggest hit in the UK, where it peaked at number 36 on the UK Singles Chart.

In 1989, they signed with Warner Bros. and released the hit album Silky Soul, plus Back to Basics in 1993, and released the live DVD recording at London's Hammersmith Odeon in 1994. The two albums also attained gold disc status. They had another number one R&B success with "Can't Get Over You". In 2009, a tribute to the hits of Maze was released. Called Silky Soul Music: An All Star Tribute to Maze Featuring Frankie Beverly, it included modern stars performing Maze's biggest hits with Maze acting as the backing band.

In recent years, it has become tradition for the audience to honor the group by dressing in all-white attire, as the group has often worn while performing. On September 2, 2011, their percussionist and background singer, McKinley "Bug" Williams, died suddenly of an apparent heart attack. On May 9, 2023, it was reported that due to a labor dispute with Beverly's management, long-time Maze band members, Jubu, Vance Taylor, Larry Kimpel, Calvin Napper and Daniel Weatherspoon along with original member Roame left and started their own group, TMF "The Music Forever" Formerly of Maze. However, Beverly remained and began performing with new band members hired via his management. Beverly hung up his microphone in July 2023 with his final two concerts being held fittingly in his hometown of Philadelphia at the Dell Music Center. Following Beverly’s retirement, the band formerly known as “Maze Featuring Frankie Beverly” plans to carry on as “Maze Honoring Frankie Beverly.” The new lead singer is Tony Lindsay, formerly of Santana.

On September 10, 2024, Frankie Beverly died from a heart attack while at home at the age of 77.

== Discography ==
=== Studio albums ===
Year	Album	Peak chart positions				Certifications	Record label
Year	Album	US	US R&B	CAN	UK	Certifications	Record label
1977	Maze featuring Frankie Beverly	52	6	—	—	RIAA: Gold	Capitol
1978	Golden Time of Day	27	9	83	—	RIAA: Gold	Capitol
1979	Inspiration	33	5	54	—	RIAA: Gold	Capitol
1980	Joy and Pain	31	5	—	—	RIAA: Gold	Capitol
1983	We Are One	25	5	—	38		Capitol
1985	Can't Stop the Love	45	1	—	41	RIAA: Gold	Capitol
1989	Silky Soul	37	1	—	43	RIAA: Gold	Warner Bros.
1993	Back to Basics	37	3	—	—	RIAA: Gold	Warner Bros.
"—" denotes a recording that did not chart or was not released in that territory.

=== Live albums ===
Year	Album	Peak chart positions			Certifications	Record label
Year	Album	US	US R&B	UK	Certifications	Record label
1981	Live in New Orleans	34	3	—	RIAA: Gold	Capitol
1986	Live in Los Angeles	92	12	70		Capitol
"—" denotes releases that did not chart or were not released in that territory.

=== Compilation albums ===
Year	Album	Peaks	Certifications	Record label
Year	Album	US R&B	Certifications	Record label
1988	Southern Girl	—		Capitol
1989	The Greatest Hits of Maze...Lifelines, Vol. 1	57		Capitol
1996	Anthology	57	RIAA: Gold	The Right Stuff
1998	Greatest Slow Jams	—		The Right Stuff
2002	Classic Masters	—		Capitol
2004	Greatest Hits	79		The Right Stuff
2011	Greatest Hits	—		Capitol
"—" denotes releases that did not chart or were not released in that territory.

=== Singles ===
Year	Single	Peak chart positions				Album
Year	Single	US	US R&B	NL	UK	Album
1977	"While I'm Alone"	89	21	—	—	Maze featuring Frankie Beverly
1977	"Lady of Magic"	108	13	—	—	Maze featuring Frankie Beverly
1978	"Workin' Together"	—	9	—	—	Golden Time of Day
1978	"Golden Time of Day" (A-side)	—	39	—	—	Golden Time of Day
1978	"Travelin' Man" (B-side)	—	39	—	—	Golden Time of Day
1978	"I Wish You Well"	—	61	—	—	Golden Time of Day
1979	"Feel That You're Feelin'"	67	7	—	—	Inspiration
1979	"Timin'"	—	55	—	—	Inspiration
1980	"Southern Girl"	—	9	—	—	Joy and Pain
1980	"The Look in Your Eyes"	—	29	—	—	Joy and Pain
1980	"Joy and Pain"	—	—	—	—	Joy and Pain
1981	"Running Away"	—	7	—	—	Live in New Orleans
1981	"Before I Let Go"	—	13	—	—	Live in New Orleans
1982	"We Need Love to Live"	—	29	—	—	Live in New Orleans
1983	"Love Is the Key"	80	5	—	88	We Are One
1983	"Never Let You Down"	—	26	—	—	We Are One
1983	"We Are One"	—	47	—	86	We Are One
1983	"I Wanna Thank You"	—	59	—	—	We Are One
1985	"Back in Stride"	88	1	—	79	Can't Stop the Love
1985	"Too Many Games"	103	5	—	36	Can't Stop the Love
1985	"I Want to Feel I'm Wanted"	—	28	—	—	Can't Stop the Love
1986	"I Wanna Be with You"	—	12	—	55	Live in Los Angeles
1986	"When You Love Someone"	—	38	—	—	Live in Los Angeles
1989	"Joy and Pain" (re-release)	—	—	—	57	Joy and Pain
1989	"Can't Get Over You"	—	1	—	89	Silky Soul
1989	"Silky Soul"	—	4	76	—	Silky Soul
1990	"Love's on the Run"	—	13	—	—	Silky Soul
1990	"Songs of Love"	—	37	—	—	Silky Soul
1993	"Laid Back Girl"	—	15	—	—	Back to Basics
1993	"The Morning After"	115	19	—	—	Back to Basics
1994	"What Goes Up"	—	32	—	—	Back to Basics
2001	"Teach Each Other"	—	123	—	—	The Brothers - Music from the Motion Picture
"—" denotes a recording that did not chart or was not released in that territory.

== Videos ==
- Live in New Orleans (1981)
- Live in Los Angeles (1986)
- Live in London (1994)
- Live in Philly (1996)
