= Frankie Beverly =

American singer (1946–2024)

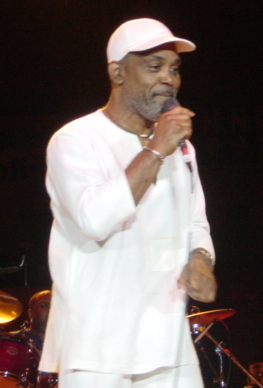
- Beverly in 2002

Background information
- Born: Howard Stanley Beverly; December 6, 1946; Philadelphia, Pennsylvania, U.S.
- Died: September 10, 2024 (aged 77)
- Genres: R&B; soul; funk; Philadelphia soul
- Occupations: Singer; musician; songwriter; record producer
- Instruments: Vocals; guitar; piano
- Years active: 1963–2024
- Formerly of: Maze

Howard Stanley Beverly (December 6, 1946 – September 10, 2024), known as Frankie Beverly, was an American singer, songwriter, and producer known primarily for his recordings with Maze, the soul and funk band. He formed Maze, originally called Raw Soul, in his hometown of Philadelphia in 1970. After Maze moved to San Francisco and was introduced to Marvin Gaye, they released nine gold albums creating a large and devoted following.

== Early life and career ==
Howard Stanley Beverly was born in Philadelphia and began singing gospel music as a schoolboy in a local church. He grew up in the East Germantown section of the city and was a graduate of Germantown High School (now defunct).

As a teenager, he formed The Blenders, a short-lived a cappella doo-wop group which was influenced by the Dells, the Moonglows, and the Del Vikings. After the group dissolved, he started the Butlers in 1963 (which later became Frankie Beverly and the Butlers). It was the first group with which he recorded. In 1967, he cut "If That's What You Wanted", which became a Northern soul standard. The group caught the attention of record producer Kenny Gamble, who eventually released their recordings.

Music performed by The Butlers did not fit into the "Philly Sound" and after heavy touring, the group went to San Francisco. The unit was re-christened as Raw Soul and Marvin Gaye's sister-in-law noticed them. Gaye featured them as an opening act at his shows and convinced Beverly to change the band's name to Maze. The group's popularity was enhanced considerably in the UK by Greg Edwards, a Grenadian DJ in North West England and Robbie Vincent, a London DJ in the late 1970s and early 1980s when they performed live at Lyceum Ballroom in London for broadcast on Capital Radio. They are best known there for their UK No. 57 hit single "Joy and Pain".

In 2019, Beverly's hit single with Maze, "Before I Let Go" was covered by Beyoncé as a bonus track on her fifth live album Homecoming: The Live Album. Beverly told Billboard that the cover was "one of the high points of (his) life... in a class of its own" and it made him "feel bigger than ever! I feel like I have a huge smash out there." Keith Washington also covered "Before I Let Go", renamed, "We Need to Talk Before I Let Go", on his album "You Make it Easy" album in 1993.

== Style ==
Beverly's onstage attire (all white custom-designed and made casual clothing including slacks, a long-sleeved shirt, and a baseball cap) became his signature dress style over the years. It was a tradition for the audience to wear all white to the concerts in honor of the group.

His son, Anthony, who toured as a drummer with Maze, along with his former wife, entertainment attorney Heather Beverly, organized a tribute album to Anthony's father called 'Silky Soul Music: An All-Star Tribute to Maze Featuring Frankie Beverly' in 2009. They founded the Brantera, a record label, as an homage to Maze's music. Mary J. Blige, Kenneth Brian Edmonds (Babyface), and Mint Condition were among the artists taking part in performing on the album.

== Death ==
Frankie Beverly died on September 10, 2024, at the age of 77.

== Honors ==
In 2006, Beverly received the Rhythm and Blues Foundation Pioneer Award. At the BET Awards 2012, he received a Lifetime Achievement Award. On February 25, 2024, he received a TV One Urban One Honors Living Legend Award. On March 14, 2024, he received the NAACP Image Awards Lifetime Achievement Award. On May 18, 2024, Philadelphia City Council named the street in Germantown, Philadelphia on which Beverly grew up in his honor.

On October 6, 2024, he was inducted into the National Rhythm & Blues Hall of Fame. On February 1, 2025, Beverly received the Grammy Lifetime Achievement Award joining other recipients including Prince, the Clash, Frankie Valli, Taj Mahal, and Roxanne Shante.

== See also ==
- Maze (band)
