= Ledisi discography =

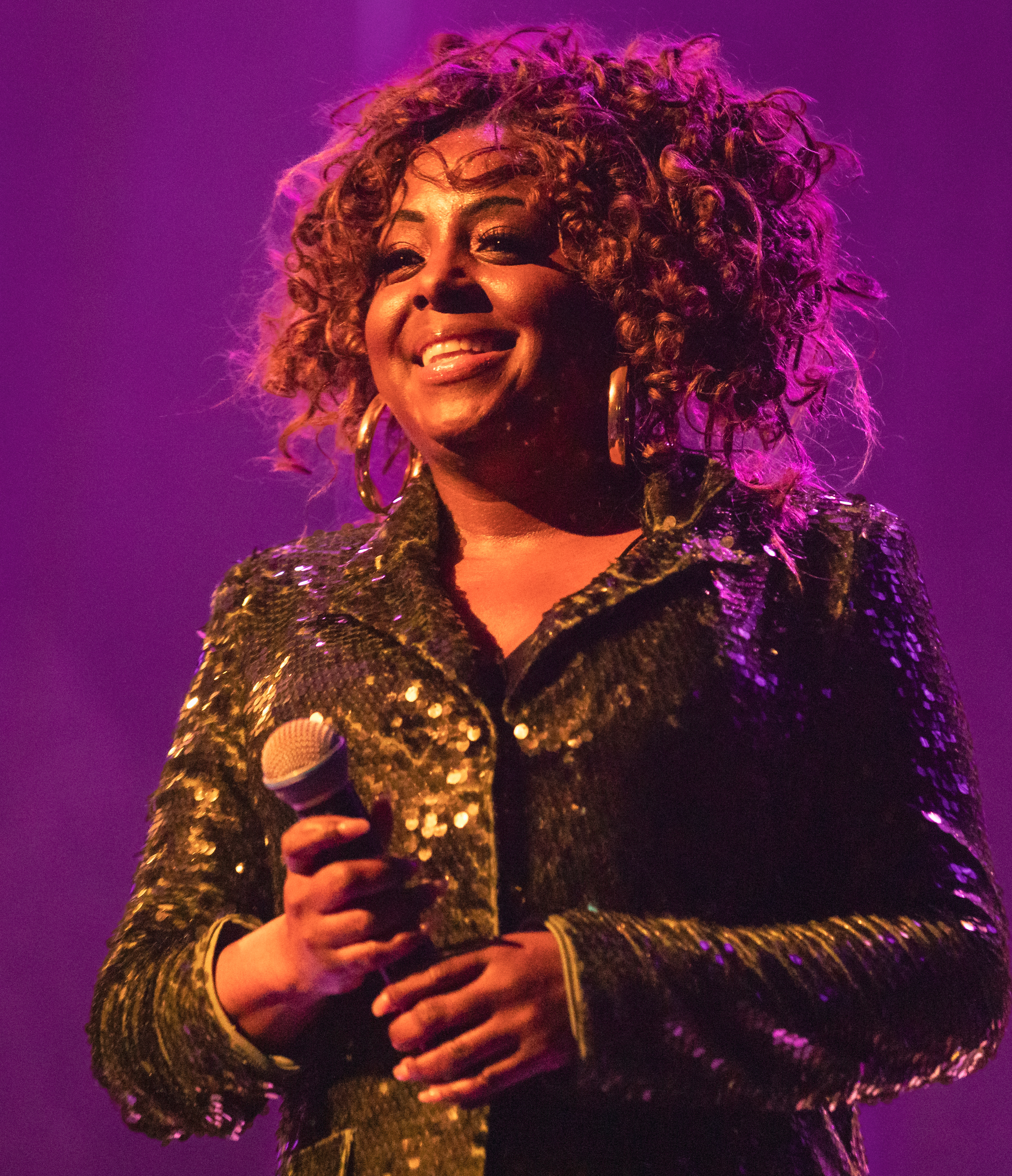
- Ledisi in 2024
- Studio albums: 13
- Extended plays: 1
- Soundtrack albums: 1
- Live albums: 3
- Singles: 43
- Box sets: 1

American singer-songwriter Ledisi has released thirteen studio albums, three live albums, one soundtrack album, one extended play, and forty-three singles, including four as a featured artist.

In 2000, she formed her own record label LeSun Music and released her first album Soulsinger (2000), followed by Feeling Orange but Sometimes Blue. In 2003, her first album was reissued as Soulsinger: The Revival on Tommy Boy Records. In the same year, she released a live extended play Ledisi and Anibade Live Recordings Vol. 1.

In 2007, Ledisi released her third album Lost & Found on Verve Forecast; marking her first album release on a major label. The album became Ledisi's first Billboard chart entry, peaking at number seventy-eight on the US Billboard 200 and number ten on the Top R&B/Hip-Hop Albums chart. It featured the singles "Alright", "In the Morning", and "Joy"; all of which have peaked in the top-40 on Billboard's Adult R&B Songs chart. She released six more albums on Verve: It's Christmas (2008), Turn Me Loose (2009), Pieces of Me (2011), The Truth (2014), The Intimate Truth (2015), and Let Love Rule (2017).

In August 2020, Ledisi released The Wild Card on her own record label Listen Back Entertainment. The album's lead single "Anything for You" spent a total of two weeks atop of the Adult R&B Songs chart. She released her second live album Ledisi Live at The Troubadour on April 30, 2021. In July 2021, she released her tenth album Ledisi Sings Nina, followed by a live album titled Ledisi: A Night of Nina (2022). She released her eleventh album Good Life (2024), which spawned the number-one Adult R&B Songs chart single "I Need to Know". In 2025, she released two albums: The Crown and For Dinah.

== Albums ==
=== Studio albums ===
Title	Album details	Peak chart positions				Sales
Title	Album details	US	US R&B /HH	US Jazz	US R&B	Sales
Soulsinger	Released: January 1, 2000; Label: LeSun Music; Formats: CD	—	—	—	—	
Feeling Orange but Sometimes Blue	Released: January 1, 2002; Label: LeSun Music; Formats: CD	—	—	—	—	
Lost & Found	Released: August 28, 2007; Label: Verve Forecast; Formats: CD, digital download	78	10	—	—	US: 237,000 (as of 2009)
It's Christmas	Released: September 23, 2008; Label: Verve Forecast; Formats: CD, digital download	—	28	—	—	
Turn Me Loose	Released: August 18, 2009; Label: Verve Forecast; Formats: CD, digital download	14	1	—	—	US: 240,000 (as of 2012)
Pieces of Me	Released: June 14, 2011; Label: Verve Forecast; Formats: CD, digital download	8	2	—	—	US: 267,000 (as of 2013)
The Truth	Released: March 11, 2014; Label: Verve Forecast; Formats: CD, digital download	14	6	—	4	US: 77,000 (as of 2015)
Let Love Rule	Released: September 26, 2017; Label: Verve Forecast; Formats: CD, digital download, online streaming	100	—	—	12	
The Wild Card	Released: August 28, 2020; Label: Listen Back Entertainment, BMG; Formats: CD, digital download, vinyl, streaming	—	—	—	—	
Ledisi Sings Nina	Released: July 23, 2021; Label: Listen Back Entertainment, BMG; Formats: CD, digital download, vinyl, streaming	—	—	13	—	
Good Life	Released: March 15, 2024; Label: Listen Back Entertainment, BMG; Formats: CD, digital download, vinyl, streaming	—	—	—	—	
The Crown	Released: April 25, 2025; Label: Listen Back Entertainment, BMG; Formats: CD, digital download, streaming	—	—	—	—	
For Dinah	Released: October 3, 2025; Label: Listen Back Entertainment, Candid; Formats: CD, digital download, vinyl, streaming	—	—	17	—	
"—" denotes a recording that did not chart.

=== Live albums ===
Title	Album details	Peak chart positions	
Title	Album details	US R&B /HH	US R&B
Ledisi and Anibade Live Recordings Vol. 1	Released: 2003; Label: LeSun Music; Formats: CD	—	—
The Intimate Truth	Released: January 20, 2015; Label: Verve; Formats: CD, digital download	26	12
Ledisi Live at The Troubadour	Released: April 30, 2021; Label: Listen Back Entertainment, BMG; Formats: digital download	—	—
Ledisi: A Night of Nina	Released: November 18, 2022; Label: Fig Street Films; Formats: CD, DVD	—	—

=== Soundtrack albums ===
Title	Album details
The Mahalia Jackson Story: Original Motion Picture Soundtrack	Released: November 18, 2022; Label: ENME, 360MusicWorX; Formats: Digital download, streaming

=== Box sets ===
Title	Album details
Turn Me Loose / It's Christmas	Released: November 30, 2009; Label: Verve; Formats: CD

== Singles ==
=== As lead artist ===
List of singles as lead artist, with selected chart positions and certifications, showing year released and album name
Title	Year	Peak chart positions			Certifications	Album
Title	Year	US	US R&B /HH	US Adult R&B	Certifications	Album
"Take Time"	2000	—	—	—		Soulsinger
"Get Outta My Kitchen"	2000	—	—	—		Soulsinger
"Good Lovin'"	2000	—	—	—		Soulsinger
"Feeling Orange but Sometimes Blue"	2002	—	—	—		Feeling Orange but Sometimes Blue
"Autumn Leaves"	2002	—	—	—		Feeling Orange but Sometimes Blue
"Alright"	2007	—	45	11		Lost & Found
"In the Morning"	2008	—	49	15		Lost & Found
"Joy"	2008	—	103	29		Lost & Found
"Give Love on Christmas Day"	2008	—	113	—		It's Christmas
"Goin' Thru Changes"	2009	—	43	15		Turn Me Loose
"Higher Than This"	2009	—	63	22		Turn Me Loose
"Everything Changes"	2009	—	—	—		Turn Me Loose
"Pieces of Me"	2011	— (Note: "Pieces of Me" did not enter the US Billboard Hot 100, but peaked at number 14 on the Bubbling Under Hot 100 Singles chart.)	19	2	RIAA: Gold	Pieces of Me
"So Into You"	2011	—	—	—		Pieces of Me
"Stay Together" (featuring Jaheim)	2011	—	23	4		Pieces of Me
"Bravo"	2012	—	55	14		Pieces of Me
"I Blame You"	2013	—	50	3		The Truth
"Like This"	2014	—	— (Note: "Like This" did not enter the US Hot R&B/Hip-Hop Songs, but peaked at number 46 on the US R&B/Hip-Hop Airplay chart.)	9		The Truth
"Lose Control"	2015	—	—	21		The Truth
"High"	2017	—	— (Note: "High" did not enter the US Hot R&B/Hip-Hop Songs, but peaked at number 38 on the US R&B/Hip-Hop Airplay chart.)	7		Let Love Rule
"Add to Me"	2017	—	—	19		Let Love Rule
"If You Don't Mind" (featuring Kirk Franklin)	2017	—	—	—		Let Love Rule
"All the Way"	2018	—	— (Note: "All the Way" did not enter the US Hot R&B/Hip-Hop Songs, but peaked at number 38 on the US R&B/Hip-Hop Airplay chart.)	8		Let Love Rule
"Anything for You"	2020	—	— (Note: "Anything for You" did not enter the US Hot R&B/Hip-Hop Songs, but peaked at number 13 on the US R&B/Hip-Hop Airplay chart.)	1		The Wild Card
"Wake Up" (featuring Sa-Roc)	2020	—	—	—		The Wild Card
"Same Love"	2021	—	—	23		The Wild Card
"Feeling Good" (featuring Metropole Orkest)	2021	—	—	—		Ledisi Sings Nina
"Home On Christmas"	2022	—	—	—		Non-album single
"I Need to Know"	2023	—	— (Note: "I Need to Know" did not enter the US Hot R&B/Hip-Hop Songs, but peaked at number 20 on the US R&B/Hip-Hop Airplay chart.)	1		Good Life
"The Knowing"	2023	—	—	—		Rustin
"Sell Me No Dreams"	2023	—	— (Note: "Sell Me No Dreams" did not enter the US Hot R&B/Hip-Hop Songs, but peaked at number 47 on the US R&B/Hip-Hop Airplay chart.)	18		Good Life
"Perfect Stranger" (featuring Kenny Lattimore)	2024	—	— (Note: "Perfect Stranger" did not enter the US Hot R&B/Hip-Hop Songs, but peaked at number 49 on the US R&B/Hip-Hop Airplay chart.)	13		Good Life
"Like It Was"	2024	—	—	—		Good Life
"Love You Too"	2025	—	—	14		The Crown
"BLKWMN"	2025	—	—	—		The Crown
"This Bitter Earth"	2025	—	—	—		For Dinah
"What a Difference a Day Makes"	2025	—	—	—		For Dinah
"You've Got What It Takes" (featuring Gregory Porter)	2025	—	—	—		For Dinah
"Teach Me Tonight"	2026	—	—	—		For Dinah
"Nobody Knows the Way I Feel This Morning"	2026	—	—	—		For Dinah
"—" denotes a recording that did not chart.

=== As a featured artist ===
List of singles as lead artist, with selected chart positions and certifications, showing year released and album name
Title	Year	Peak chart positions			Album
Title	Year	US Adult R&B	US Dance	US Jazz	Album
"Breakin' It Down" (PetalPusher featuring Ledisi)	1999	—	—	—	Colorful You
"Waters of March" (Sérgio Mendes featuring Ledisi)	2008	—	50	—	Encanto
"Be Mine for Christmas" (Kem featuring Ledisi)	2013	35	—	—	What Christmas Means
"Say Something" (Clint Holmes featuring Ledisi)	2017	—	—	29	Rendezvous
"I Belong to You" (Boney James featuring Ledisi)	2026	15	—	—	A Simple Man
"—" denotes a recording that did not chart.

== Other charted songs ==
List of songs with selected chart positions, showing year released and album name
Title	Year	Peak chart positions		Album
Title	Year	US R&B /HH	KOR Int.	Album
"Think of You"	2008	74	—	Lost & Found
"Have Yourself a Merry Little Christmas"	2008	113	—	It's Christmas
"This Christmas (Could Be the One)"	2008	112	—	It's Christmas
"I Miss You Now"	2011	—	54	Pieces of Me

== Guest appearances ==
List of non-single guest appearances, with other performing artists, showing year released and album name
Title	Year	Other artist(s)	Album
"Negros"	2000	Omar Sosa	Bembon
"Going Back to New Orleans"	2001	Poncho Sanchez	Latin Spirits
"Better Than Nothing"	2002	Braxton Brothers, Monet	Both Sides
"Whatcha Gonna Do"	2003	Frank McComb	The Truth
"Different Times"	2003	Raphael Saadiq, Goapele	All Hits at the House of Blues
"Don't Stop"	2004	Lateef and the Chief	Maroons: Ambush
"Scat World"	2004	Maysa Leak	Smooth Sailing
"World of Vibrations" "Black Diamonds and Pearls"	2005	Blackalicious	The Craft
"White Boys"	2005	Brandi Chavonne Massey, Shayna Steele	Hair — Actor's Fund of America Benefit Recording
"My Sensitivity"	2005	Boney James	Forever, for Always, for Luther
"The Rain"	2005	Oran "Juice" Jones	Def Jazz
"I Can't Let You Go"	2006	Steve Hartsman Harvey	Everyday People Project
"To Love Again"	2007	Gordon Chambers	Love Stories
"Devotion"	2007	—N/a	Interpretations: Celebrating the Music of Earth, Wind & Fire
"Blues in the Night"	2007	—N/a	We All Love Ella: Celebrating the First Lady of Song
"Alright"	2008	—N/a	Meet the Browns
"The World Keeps Going Around"	2008	Brian Culbertson	Bringing Back the Funk
"Four Women"	2010	Nina Simone, Lisa Simone, Laura Izibor	For Colored Girls: Music From and Inspired by the Original Motion Picture Soundtrack
"Then There Was You"	2011	Trombone Shorty	For True
"Gonna Be Alright"	2012	Robert Glasper	Black Radio
"Nobody Knows the Trouble I've Seen"	2014	Dr. John	Ske-Dat-De-Dat: The Spirit of Satch
"The Christmas Song"	2015	Count Basie Orchestra	A Very Swingin' Basie Christmas!
"The Sharecropper's Daughter"	2020	Sa-Roc	The Sharecropper's Daughter
"American Heartbreak"	2020	Black Thought	Music from the HBO Original Series Between the World and Me
"Be Real Black for Me"	2021	Brian Courtney Wilson	Still
"The Mask I Wear"	2025	Clara Rugaard, Tayla Parx, Rebel Wilson, Ortiz Luis, Quinn Bogart	Juliet & Romeo (Original Motion Picture Soundtrack)
"Street Fire"	2025	Clara Rugaard, Tayla Parx, Ferdia Walsh-Peelo, Nicholas Podany, Jamie Ward, Max Parker	Juliet & Romeo (Original Motion Picture Soundtrack)

== Songwriting credits ==
List of songwriting credits, excluding recorded or featured songs
Title	Year	Other artist(s)	Album
"Missing You"	2007	Peabo Bryson	Missing You
"Walk Away"	2008	Maysa Leak	Metamorphosis
