= Alright (Ledisi song) =

2007 single by Ledisi

Single by Ledisi

from the album Lost & Found
- Released: July 3, 2007
- Recorded: 2006
- Genre: Soul
- Length: 4:34
- Label: Verve Forecast
- Songwriter(s): Ledisi Young; Rex Rideout
- Producer(s): Rex Rideout

Ledisi singles chronology
"Feeling Orange but Sometimes Blue" (2002)	"Alright" (2007)	"In the Morning" (2008)

Music video
- "Alright" on YouTube

"Alright" is a song recorded by American singer and songwriter Ledisi for her third studio album Lost & Found (2007). It was written by Ledisi, and produced by Rex Rideout with guitar played by musician Jubu Smith. Ledisi decided that she wanted a deeper and more personal song as the third single; the song was sent by Verve Forecast to contemporary hit radio in the United States on July 3, 2007. "Alright" is a soul song about dealing with personal and financial issues as well as acceptance. The single reached the top twenty on the US Adult R&B Songs chart.

Directed by Rashidi Harper and Maalik Armour, the accompanying music video follows the plot of the song's theme. "Alright" was part of Ledisi's set lists on the Pieces of Me Tour (2011), B.G.T.Y. Tour (2012), The Truth Tour (2014), The Intimate Truth Tour (2015), Let Love Rule Tour (2018), The Wild Card Tour (2021), and The Good Life Tour (2024). The song was also featured on the soundtrack of comedy-drama film Meet the Browns.

== Background and release ==
In 2006, Ledisi contemplated quitting the music industry. In an interview with The Monterey County Herald, Ledisi recalled having a bad experience during a show. During this time, she was sleeping on the floor of a friend's apartment with only sixty-eight US dollars in her account while performing on Broadway. She eventually called her mother Nyra Dynese who eventually encouraged her to remain in the music industry and not give up. The conversation inspired Ledisi to write "Alright" about hard times she experienced in her personal life.

"Alright" was the first single released from Lost & Found, marking her first music release on a major record label. A CD single was released on July 3, 2007. A maxi-single was also released which features house music remixes by producers Matthias Heilbronn and Davin Warrin.

== Commercial performance ==
"Alright" debuted at number sixty-six on the US Hot R&B/Hip-Hop Songs in the week of August 4, 2007. After twenty-one weeks on the chart, "Alright" peaked at number forty-five during the week of December 29, 2007. The song ultimately remained on the charts for a total of twenty-weeks. "Alright" debuted on the US Adult R&B Songs chart in week of August 11, 2007. After twenty-two weeks on the chart, the song peaked at number eleven. The song remained on the chart for a total of twenty-nine weeks. The song sold over 45,000 copies in its first week.

== Music video ==
The music video for "Alright" was directed by Rashidi Harper and Maalik Armour. "Alright" was the first music video to be filmed and released by Ledisi. The video aired on BET J's music video program Soul Sessions in 2007.

A short music video clip of Ledisi performing "In the Morning" opens the "Alright" video. The music video features Ledisi waking up in her apartment and later walking around her neighborhood while performing the song.

== Live performances ==
During her performance at Newport Jazz Festival on August 8, 2008, Ledisi told a brief story about the inspiration and composition of the song before bridging into the performance.

"Alright" was also included on the set list of Ledisi's Pieces of Me Tour that began in October 2011. During The Truth Tour in 2014, Ledisi told the audience about the circumstances that led up to the composition of "Alright". "Alright" served an encore song for The Truth Tour (2014) and Let Love Rule Tour (2018), and served the opening song for The Good Life Tour (2024).

== Track listing and formats ==
- CD Single 1
1. "Alright" (Album Version) – 4:38
- CD Single 2
1. "Alright" (Radio Edit #1) – 3:48
2. "Alright" (Radio Edit #2) – 3:48
3. "Alright" (Album Version) – 4:34
- Maxi-single 1
1. "Alright" (Matty's Soulflower Mix) – 8:09
2. "Alright" (Matty's PDP Vocal Mix) – 8:08
3. "Alright" (Matty's Soulflower Instrumental) – 8:07
4. "Alright" (Dave Warrin Vocal Mix) – 6:25
5. "Alright" (Dave Warrin Instrumental Mix) – 6:25
6. "Alright" (Album Version) – 4:34
- Maxi-single 2
1. "Alright" (Funky Junction & Antony Reale Radio Edit) – 3:52
2. "Alright" (Funky Junction & Antony Reale Extended Remix) – 7:13
3. "Alright" (Funky Junction & Antony Extended Remix Instrumental) – 7:13
4. "Alright" (Matty's Soulflower Mix) – 8:09
5. "Alright" (Matty's PDP Vocal Mix) – 8:08
6. "Alright" (Matty's Soulflower Instrumental) – 8:07
7. "Alright" (Angel Manuel's Twisted Late Nite Mix) – 7:42
8. "Alright" (Angel Manuel's Twisted Late Nite Instrumental) – 7:42
9. "Alright" (Dave Warrin Vocal Mix) – 6:25
10. "Alright" (Dave Warrin Instrumental Mix) – 6:25
11. "Alright" (Album Version) – 4:34

== Charts ==
=== Weekly charts ===
Weekly chart performance for "Alright"
Chart (2007)	Peak position
US Hot R&B/Hip-Hop Songs (Billboard)	45
US Adult R&B Songs (Billboard)	11
