= Pieces of Me =

Pieces of Me may refer to:

- Pieces of Me (Linda Hoyle album), 1971
- Pieces of Me (Ledisi album), 2011
  - "Pieces of Me" (Ledisi song)
  - Pieces of Me Tour by Ledisi in 2011
- Pieces of Me (Lori McKenna album), 2001
- Pieces of Me (film), a 2012 French comedy film
- Pieces of Me, a 2018 album by Tiffany
- "Pieces of Me" (Ashlee Simpson song), 2004
- "Pieces of Me", a song by Meat Puppets from the album Golden Lies, 2000
- "Pieces of Me", a song by 3 Doors Down from the album Us and the Night, 2016

== See also ==
- Piece of Me (disambiguation)
