= I Blame You (Ledisi song) =

2013 single by Ledisi

Single by Ledisi

from the album The Truth
- Released: September 30, 2013
- Genre: R&B
- Length: 4:14
- Label: Verve Forecast
- Songwriter(s): Charles T. Harmon; Claude Kelly; Ledisi Young
- Producer(s): Chuck Harmony; Claude Kelly; Ledisi Young

Ledisi singles chronology
"Bravo" (2012)	"I Blame You" (2013)	"Like This" (2014)

Music video
- "I Blame You" on YouTube

"I Blame You" is a song by American singer and songwriter Ledisi for her seventh studio album, The Truth (2014). The song was written by Ledisi, Chuck Harmony, and Claude Kelly, with the latter two producing the song. The song's lyrics are about "blaming" their partner for the happiness in their life.

"I Blame You" was released as the album's lead single to US radio stations on September 30, 2013. The single was released through Verve Forecast.

== Background and production ==
Following the success of "Pieces of Me", Ledisi again collaborated with producers Chuck Harmony and Claude Kelly, one of the producers of "Pieces of Me". Kelly came up with the song's title. Ledisi also scatted on the song, a singing technique she had not displayed since her third album Lost & Found (2007).

== Commercial performance ==
"I Blame You" debuted on the US Adult R&B Songs chart in the week of November 2, 2013. After twenty weeks on the chart, the song peaked at number three during the week of May 17, 2014. The song remained on charts for a total of thirty-eight weeks.

The song also debuted and peaked at number fifty on the US Hot R&B/Hip-Hop Songs chart in week of April 19, 2014, only remaining on the chart for one week. "I Blame You" was more successful on the US Hot R&B Songs chart where it peaked at number twenty-one during its third week on the chart.

== Music video ==
The accompanying music video for "I Blame You", directed by Derek Blanks, premiered on Essence in December 2013.

The music video starts with Ledisi at work, with a female coworker inviting her to a high-heel shoe dance class. Wearing tape-covered glasses and a long sweater, she goes unnoticed to a male coworker that she displays interest in. She reconsiders the offer to join the dance class and gradually dawns a new sexual persona over time, even learning choreography with each class attendance. Eventually as she returns to work, she attracts the attention of the coworker who eventually asks her on date. The video ends with Ledisi displaying the learned choreography in front of the male coworker during the date.

== Live performances ==
Ledisi performed "I Blame You" during various public appearances. On November 3, 2013, Ledisi debuted her single "I Blame You" in a performance at the annual Black Girls Rock! award show. During the performance, Ledisi performed a dance break alongside her four background dancers, choreographed by American choreographer Brandee Evans. On March 13, 2014, Ledisi performed "I Blame You" on Late Show with David Letterman.

The song was a part of Ledisi's set list for her third concert tour The Truth Tour in 2014 and the follow-up The Intimate Truth Tour in 2015. It was performed late in the show during the concert tours and was the closing song on selected dates. During The Truth Tour, Ledisi performed choreography along with her two background dancers.

"I Blame You" has become a staple in Ledisi's tours, being added to all of her concert tours except the Nina and Me Tour (2019) and Ledisi Sings Nina Tour (2021). During the COVID-19 pandemic, Ledisi was unable to tour in the latter part of 2020. On September 12, 2020, she gave on a free virtual concert titled This One's for You: A Night of Ledisi Live. Audio from Ledisi's performance of "I Blame You" at the Troubadour in West Hollywood, California was released on her live album Ledisi Live at The Troubadour (2021).

== Track listing ==
- Digital download
1. "I Blame You"

== Charts ==
Weekly chart performance for "I Blame You"
Chart (2013)	Peak position
South Korea International (Circle)	37
US Adult R&B Songs (Billboard)	3
US Hot R&B/Hip-Hop Songs (Billboard)	50
US Hot R&B Songs (Billboard)	21
