= Pieces of Me (Ledisi song) =

2011 single by Ledisi

Single by Ledisi

from the album Pieces of Me
- Released: April 5, 2011
- Genre: R&B
- Length: 3:23
- Label: Verve Forecast
- Songwriters: Charles T. Harmon; Claude Kelly; Ledisi Young
- Producers: Chuck Harmony; Claude Kelly; Ledisi Young

Ledisi singles chronology
"Please Stay" (2010)	"Pieces of Me" (2011)	"So Into You" (2011)

Music video
- "Pieces of Me" on YouTube

"Pieces of Me" is a song by American singer and songwriter Ledisi for her sixth studio album, Pieces of Me (2011). The song was written by Ledisi, Chuck Harmony, Claude Kelly, with the latter two producing the song. The song's lyrics are about the meaning of being a woman.

"Pieces of Me" was released as the album's lead single to US radio stations on April 5, 2011. The single was released through Verve Forecast. It was nominated for Best R&B Performance and Best R&B Song at the 54th Annual Grammy Awards.

The single became Ledisi's highest-charting song on the US Hot R&B/Hip-Hop Songs. "Pieces of Me" was certified gold by the Recording Industry Association of America (RIAA).

== Background and production ==
Ledisi began recording her sixth album Pieces of Me in late 2010. She worked with many music producers that she has not collaborated with on previous music projects. Ledisi co-wrote the song "Pieces of Me" with American music producers Chuck Harmony and Claude Kelly; with the latter two producing the song. Lance Tolbert played bass guitar on the song.

== Music and lyrics ==
"Pieces of Me" is a contemporary R&B ballad. It also contains elements of jazz and blues. The song's lyrics are constructed in the verse-chorus pattern. Ledisi told Houston Press, "This song is about celebrating being a very intricate woman which means I can be complex, change my mind and still be a strong and happy individual." A piano opens the song, followed by Ledisi performing the first verse as the bass guitar and drums start.

== Release ==
"Pieces of Me" was released on April 5, 2011, by Verve Forecast to US radio stations. The song was also released to digital music stores on the same day.

== Critical reception ==
"Pieces of Me" debuted to positive reviews among critics. Music magazine Billboard's Jazmine Gray praised Ledisi for her display of powerful vocals on the song. The magazine also stated, "Her heartfelt lyrics and keen vocals create a passionate ballad, and if this single is any indication, Ledisi is sure to have another praiseworthy album." Evelyn McDonnell of Los Angeles Times praised the assertiveness with Ledisi delivers her lines, stating "She sings the affirmation a few times, for good measure: “I’m a woman” — neither shouted nor whispered, with a few notes of piano and a slight echo for minimal effect." The Mercury News deemed the song "an empowerment lecture over a processional groove, with lyrics about how women are complicated but righteous."

== Accolades ==
"Pieces of Me" was nominated for Best R&B Song and Best R&B Performance at the 54th Annual Grammy Awards in 2012.

== Commercial performance ==
"Pieces of Me" debuted at number fifty-eight on the US Hot R&B/Hip-Hop Songs on April 23, 2011. On July 9, 2011, the song peaked at number nineteen on the chart, marking her highest position on the chart. It remained on the chart for a total of thirty-one weeks. "Pieces of Me" was more successful on the US Adult R&B Songs chart where it debuted at number twenty-three April 2, 2011. The song peaked at number two on August 6, 2011, becoming her highest-charting song on the chart until the release of her song "Anything for You" (2020). "Pieces of Me" spent a total of thirty weeks on the US Adult R&B Songs chart.

On July 23, 2011, "Pieces of Me" debuted at number twenty-three on the Heatseekers Songs chart. The song gradually dropped lower in positions until falling off the chart after four weeks. On August 20, 2011, "Pieces of Me" peaked at number fourteen on the Bubbling Under Hot 100 chart, the equivalent chart position of 114 on the Billboard Hot 100. The song also earned a gold certification by the RIAA.

== Live performances ==
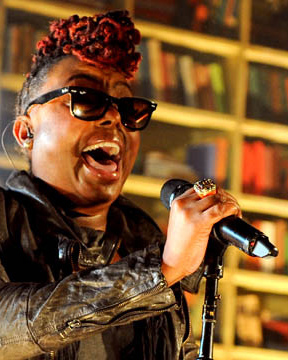
Ledisi performing "Pieces of Me" at Walmart Soundcheck. (2011)

Ledisi performed "Pieces of Me" during various public appearances, including the Tom Joyner Morning Show, Late Night with Jimmy Fallon, and 106 & Park.

The song was a part of Ledisi's set list for her debut concert tour Pieces of Me Tour in 2011 and the follow-up B.G.T.Y. Tour in 2012. It was performed late in the show during the concert tours and was the closing song on selected dates. During the Pieces of Me Tour, Ledisi entered the audience while performing "Pieces of Me" and gave the microphone to different fans to sing along with her. Baltimore Afro-American reviewed the performance as one of the highlights of the concert.

"Pieces of Me" was also included in the set list of the concert tours: The Truth Tour (2014), The Intimate Truth Tour (2015), Let Love Rule Tour (2018), The Wild Card Tour (2021), and The Good Life Tour (2024). During the COVID-19 pandemic, Ledisi was unable to tour in the latter part of 2020. On September 12, 2020, she gave on a free virtual concert titled This One's for You: A Night of Ledisi Live. Audio from Ledisi's performance of "Pieces of Me" at the Troubadour in West Hollywood, California was released on her live album Ledisi Live at The Troubadour (2021).

== Track listing ==
- Digital download
1. "Pieces of Me"

== Credits and personnel ==
Credits are adapted from the Pieces of Me liner notes.

- Vocals: Ledisi
- Keyboards, programming, production: Chuck Harmony
- Production: Claude Kelly
- Bass guitar: Lance Tolbert
- Recording: Trevor Gates
- Mix engineer: Jaycen Joshua
  - Assisted by: Jesus Garnica

== Charts ==
Weekly chart performance for "Pieces of Me"
Chart (2011)	Peak position
South Korea International (Circle)	18
US Adult R&B Songs (Billboard)	2
US Bubbling Under Hot 100	14
US Heatseekers (Billboard)	23
US Hot R&B/Hip-Hop Songs (Billboard)	19
US Mainstream R&B/Hip-Hop Airplay (Billboard)	38

Chart (2014)	Peak position
South Korea International (Circle)	82
