= In the Morning (Ledisi song) =

2008 single by Ledisi

Single by Ledisi

from the album Lost & Found
- B-side: "Alright" (Matty's Soulflower Mix)
- Released: March 18, 2008
- Recorded: 2007
- Genre: R&B
- Length: 4:48
- Label: Verve Forecast
- Songwriters: Ledisi Young; Rex Rideout
- Producer: Rex Rideout

Ledisi singles chronology
"Alright" (2007)	"In the Morning" (2008)	"Joy" (2008)

Music video
- "In the Morning" on YouTube

"In the Morning" is a song by American singer and songwriter Ledisi for her third studio album, Lost & Found (2007). The song was written by Ledisi and Rex Rideout, with the latter producing the song. "In the Morning" was released the second single from Lost & Found on March 18, 2008, by Verve Forecast.

== Production and composition ==
"In the Morning" is a mid-tempo ballad. According to Chordify, the album version is positioned on the piece of B♭ minor and plated in 130 beats per minute.

== Critical reception ==
"In the Morning" received positive reviews from music critics. Matthew Chisling of All Music commented "Tracks like "In the Morning," shattering ballads of love and so much more, glisten like chocolate-covered strawberries with every listen. The soulful dazzle that makes stars out of singers is heard in every beat, every note, and every word."

== Commercial performance ==
"In the Morning" became Ledisi's second song to receive a Billboard chart entry. The song entered the US Hot R&B/Hip-Hop Songs chart at number 84 on March 8, 2008. The following week, the song moved up to number 70. On April 3, 2008, the song peaked at number 49 on the chart. The song spent a total of twenty weeks on the US Hot R&B/Hip-Hop Songs chart. On April 12, 2008, "In the Morning" peaked at number 15 on the US Adult R&B Songs.

"In the Morning" sold over 23,000 copies in its first week.

== Music video ==
Two music videos were shot for the song. The first version was directed by Rashidi Harper and Maalik Armour, which serves as a thirty-second opening montage for the song "Alright". The video captures Ledisi performing the chorus of the song in a dark room behind a stationed microphone.

The second version, considered to be the official version, was directed by Marc Andre Debruyne. The single version of the song was used for the music video. The music video opens Ledisi laying on a couch while remembering her time spent with her boyfriend (portrayed by Christian Keyes). She soon arrives back home to find a note left on the table. Her boyfriend is shown working late hours at work with his female co-worker (portrayed by Candice Patton). The co-worker attempts to seduce him even after learning that he is in a relationship with Ledisi, going as far as to turn a framed picture of Ledisi face down on his desk. Mid-way in the video, Ledisi is shown in a blue dress on an apartment rooftop, awaiting for her boyfriend. The boyfriend leaves his co-worker at the job after she attempts to kiss him. The video ends with the boyfriend meeting Ledisi on the rooftop.

== Live performances ==
Ledisi performed "In the Morning" during her televised performance on Baisden After Dark on August 9, 2008. The song was a part of Ledisi's set list for her tour B.G.T.Y. Tour and The Truth Tour. In both sets, the song was performed in the middle of the show. A live audio recording from Ledisi's performance at The Troubadour in West Hollywood, California was released on Ledisi Live at the Troubadour (2021). The song was performed as a mashup with her songs "All the Way" and "Same Love".

== Track listings ==
- Digital EP
1. "In the Morning" (Album version) – 4:48
2. "In the Morning" (Live Remix (w/o Crowd)) – 3:56
3. "Alright" (Matty's Soulflower Mix) – 8:09

== Charts ==
=== Weekly charts ===
Weekly chart performance for "Alright"
Chart (2007)	Peak position
US Hot R&B/Hip-Hop Songs (Billboard)	49
US Adult R&B Songs (Billboard)	15
