= The Intimate Truth =

Live album by Ledisi
- Released: January 20, 2015
- Recorded: 2014
- Venue: NRG Recording Studios (North Hollywood, Los Angeles)
- Genres: R&B; acoustic
- Length: 29:42
- Label: Verve
- Producer: Ledisi

Ledisi chronology
| The Truth (2014) | The Intimate Truth (2015) | Let Love Rule (2017) |

The Intimate Truth is a live album by American singer Ledisi. It was released on January 20, 2015, by Verve Records. Recorded in July 2014, the album contains acoustic versions of songs from her seventh album The Truth (2014).

== Background and development ==
The Intimate Truth was recorded and filmed at NRG Recording Studios in Los Angeles, California, in July 2014. The album features six acoustic recordings of songs from her seventh album The Truth (2014). In an interview with Rated R&B about selecting which songs to perform, Ledisi stated, "It was easy because I wanted to make sure it was upbeat and not too slow for me. That's not where I’m at right now. It still had to represent where I am. I’m in a feel-good mood."

== Release and promotion ==
On December 9, 2014, Ledisi announced that The Intimate Truth was available for preorder. On January 20, 2015, The Intimate Truth was released by Verve Records. On February 10, 2015, the deluxe edition of the album was released exclusively to Apple Music. The deluxe edition features audio recordings of the album, in addition to the film recording as well as concert footage from The Truth Tour. The in-studio performance was recorded by director Ron T. Young. On February 27, 2015, Ledisi embarked on The Intimate Truth Tour to promote the album.

== Critical reception ==
Professional ratings
Review scores
| Source | Rating |
|---|---|
| AllMusic | 3.5/5 stars |

AllMusic's Andy Kellman commented on the album's performance and noted "Cynics might see The Intimate Truth as an opportunistic stop-gap -- it also preceded a tour of the same name -- but it's a full effort and shines a brighter light on the richness of Ledisi's voice, as well as the substance of her (and her collaborators') songwriting." Elias Leight of Billboard magazine praised her performance on the song "Rock with You" commenting, "Ledisi moves easily between smooth vocal runs on the verses and explosive ad-libs on the hook; at one point, she starts scat-singing. She works with minimal accompaniment — jagged acoustic guitar and firm bass — which is all she needs to deliver a heavy dose of groove."

== Commercial performance ==
The Intimate Truth debuted at number 26 on the US Top R&B/Hip-Hop Albums chart, where it remained on the chart for two weeks. The album also peaked at number 12 on the Top R&B Albums chart.

== Track listing ==
Standard edition
| No. | Title | Length |
|---|---|---|
| 1. | "Rock with You" | 3:59 |
| 2. | "Like This" | 3:59 |
| 3. | "I Swear" | 3:46 |
| 4. | "I Blame You" | 4:37 |
| 5. | "The Truth" | 5:27 |
| 6. | "Lose Control" | 5:02 |
| 7. | "That Good Good" | 2:52 |

Deluxe edition
| No. | Title | Length |
|---|---|---|
| 1. | "Rock with You" | 3:59 |
| 2. | "Like This" | 3:59 |
| 3. | "I Swear" | 3:46 |
| 4. | "I Blame You" | 4:37 |
| 5. | "The Truth" | 5:27 |
| 6. | "Lose Control" | 5:02 |
| 7. | "Like This (Acoustic live video)" | 4:01 |
| 8. | "Rock with You (Acoustic live video)" | 3:59 |
| 9. | "Intro (The Truth Tour)" | 0.57 |
| 10. | "That Good Good (The Truth Tour)" | 4:52 |
| 11. | "Rock with You (The Truth Tour)" | 4:54 |
| 12. | "Bravo (The Truth Tour)" | 4:41 |
| 13. | "That Good Good (Music video)" | 3:24 |
