= Brandee Evans =

American actress and choreographer

- Born: Memphis, Tennessee, U.S.
- Occupation: Actress
- Years active: 2010–present

Brandee Evans is an American actress and former choreographer, best known for her leading role as Mercedes Woodbine in the Starz drama series, P-Valley.

== Life and career ==
Evans was born in Memphis, Tennessee. Her mother has multiple sclerosis and Alzheimer's. Before her acting career, she worked as a high school English teacher. She began her acting career playing supporting roles in films including Beyond the Lights (2014), and appearing on TV miniseries The New Edition Story and The Bobby Brown Story. As a backup dancer, Evans appears with pop singer Katy Perry in 2010 with the music video of California Gurls as "Bubblegum Girl". She also choreographed Ledisi's "I Blame You" and appeared in its music video. She also toured as a backup dancer on Ledisi's The Truth Tour in 2014.

In 2020, Evans began starring as Mercedes Woodbine in the Starz drama series, P-Valley. She received positive reviews from critics for her performance. She was nominated for the NAACP Image Award for Outstanding Actress in a Drama Series in 2021 and 2023. In 2023, she starred in the female stoner comedy film, Pretty Stoned.

== Filmography ==
=== Film ===
Year	Title	Role	Notes
2012	Note to Self	Sorority Girl	
2014	Black Coffee	Shea	
2014	Beyond the Lights	Dancer	
2019	Dear Santa, I Need a Date	Michelle	Television film
2021	B-Boy Blues	Michi	
2021	A Rich Christmas	Carolyn	
2022	Rolling Into Christmas	Celeste Franks	Television film
2023	Pretty Stoned	Tick-Tock	
2024	The Fabulous Four	Leslie	
TBA	Thirsty	Maya King	

=== Television ===
Year	Title	Role	Notes
2016	East Los High	Guest	Episode: "Caliente!"
2017	The New Edition Story	Soul Train Producer	Episode: "Part 2"
2018	Lethal Weapon	Nurse	Episode: "Diggin' Up Dirt"
2018	The Bobby Brown Story	Tina Brown	Episode: "Part 1 & 2"
2019	Ryan Hansen Solves Crimes on Television	Makeup Artist	Episode: "The Rhy Chromosome"
2019	Games People Play	Cinnamon	Episode: "The Wrath of Grapes"
2020–22	The Family Business	Sage	Recurring role, 6 episodes
2020–present	P-Valley	Mercedes Woodbine	Lead role
2025	Reasonable Doubt	Monica	Season 3

== Awards and nominations ==
Year	Award	Category	Nominated work	Result
2021	Women's Image Network Awards	Women's Image Network Award for Outstanding Actress Drama Series	P-Valley	Won
2021	NAACP Image Awards	NAACP Image Award for Outstanding Actress in a Drama Series	P-Valley	Nominated
2021	Black Reel Awards	Black Reel Award for Outstanding Actress, Drama Series	P-Valley	Nominated
2023	NAACP Image Awards	NAACP Image Award for Outstanding Actress in a Drama Series	P-Valley	Nominated
2023	Black Reel Awards	Black Reel Award for Outstanding Supporting Actress, Drama Series	P-Valley	Nominated
