= It's Christmas (Ledisi album) =

Studio album by Ledisi
- Released: September 23, 2008
- Recorded: 2008
- Genre: Christmas
- Length: 51:00
- Label: Verve Forecast
- Producers: Ledisi; George Duke; Rex Rideout; Luther "Mano" Hanes

Ledisi chronology
Lost & Found (2007)	It's Christmas (2008)	Turn Me Loose (2009)

Singles from It's Christmas
- 1. "Give Love on Christmas Day" Released: 2008

It's Christmas is the fourth studio album by American singer-songwriter Ledisi, and her first Christmas album. Released by Verve Forecast on September 23, 2008, the album features cover versions of popular Christmas songs in addition to original material. Ledisi worked with George Duke, Rex Rideout, and Luther "Mano" Hanes, with whom she wrote all of the original tracks, as well as producing Ledisi's interpretations of the covered material. "Give Love on Christmas Day" was released as a radio single from the album.

Critical response to the album's contemporary Christmas theme was positive. Some music critics complimented the "fiery gospel-soul" vocals and called the album a "more personal, more instinctual record."

== Conception and composition ==
Throughout the album's development, Ledisi worked with Rex Rideout, with whom she collaborated on Lost & Found (2007) and Interpretations: Celebrating the Music of Earth, Wind & Fire (2007). Together, they wrote one of the album's original songs, as well as producing most of the traditional tracks. In July 2008, Ledisi announced her plans to release a Christmas album. In an interview with Billboard magazine, she confirmed to be working with American trumpeter Christian Scott, American blues musician Keb' Mo', and female quartet Perri.

In addition, Ledisi recorded a cover of "What a Wonderful World" by Louis Armstrong, as well as classics such as "Please Come Home for Christmas", "Silent Night", and "Have Yourself a Merry Little Christmas".

== Release and promotion ==
It's Christmas was released on September 23, 2008, by Verve Forecast; becoming her second album release on a major record label. On December 7, 2008, the Gospel Music Channel aired a thirty-minute Christmas program titled Ledisi Christmas. The program featured Ledisi performing selected songs from It's Christmas in addition to her single "Alright".

It's Christmas was supported by the commercial single and cover version of "Give Love on Christmas Day", which peaked at number thirteen on the US Billboard Bubbling Under R&B/Hip-Hop Songs chart. An accompanying music video, directed Ron T. Young, was released on YouTube. The song "This Christmas (Could Be the One)" peaked at number twelve on the Bubbling Under R&B/Hip-Hop Songs, while her cover version of "Have Yourself a Merry Little Christmas" peaked at number thirteen on the chart. In November 2009, It's Christmas was re-released as a double box album set along with her album Turn Me Loose.

== Reception ==
Professional ratings
Review scores
Source	Rating
AllMusic	3.5/5 stars
Artistdirect	2.5/5 stars

In The Washington Post, Geoffrey Himes wrote that "artists have a chance to make a more personal, more instinctual record. There's no better example than Ledisi's terrific new disc." AllMusic editor Eric Schneider praised her rendition of "Have Yourself a Merry Little Christmas", referring to it as a "graceful take." Amy Sciarretto from Artistdirect praised It's Christmas for blending "smooth jazz, lite R&B and spiritual molds" with Ledisi's Gospel-influenced vocals, calling it "a soulful holiday album" that embraces both "disco and dance" elements. She concluded that the album offers "its own spin on songs that have stood the test of time" and is "as refreshing as a blast of Arctic air in your lungs."

== Commercial performance ==
It's Christmas debuted and peaked at number five on the US Top Holiday Albums chart during the week of October 11, 2008. The album remained on the charts for a total of five weeks. During the week of November 1, 2008, the album debuted on the US Top R&B/Hip-Hop Albums chart. During its fifth week on the chart, the album peaked at number twenty-eight. The album spent a total of fourteen weeks on the chart.

== Track listing ==
It's Christmas track listing
No.	Title	Writer(s)	Producer(s)	Length
1.	"I'll Go"	Richard Smallwood	Rex Rideout	2:03
2.	"Children Go Where I Send Thee"	Traditional	Rideout	6:10
3.	"Give Love on Christmas Day"	Berry Gordy Jr.; Fonce Mizell; Freddie Perren; Deke Richards; Christine Perren	Rideout	3:54
4.	"Be There for Christmas"	Ledisi Young; Rideout	Rideout	4:00
5.	"This Christmas (Could Be the One)"	Young; Lorenzo Johnson	Rideout	4:43
6.	"Have Yourself a Merry Little Christmas"	Hugh Martin; Ralph Blane	Rideout	4:24
7.	"What Are You Doing New Year's Eve?"	Frank Loesser	Rideout	3:06
8.	"It's Christmas"	Young; George Duke	Duke	4:50
9.	"What a Wonderful World"	Bob Thiele; George David Weiss	Rideout	4:09
10.	"Please Come Home for Christmas"	Walter Kent	Rideout	4:15
11.	"Silent Night"	Franz Xaver Gruber; Joseph Mohr	Rideout	4:48
12.	"Thank You"	Young; Luther "Mano" Hanes	Hanes	4:36
Total length:				51:00

== Personnel ==
- Ledisi – vocals, backing vocals (2, 3, 10), arrangements (11)
- Richard Smallwood – acoustic piano (1), arrangements (1)
- Rex Rideout – Wurlitzer electric piano (2), Rhodes electric piano (3, 4, 6, 9, 10), acoustic piano (4-7, 10)
- Craig Brockman – organ (2, 10)
- George Duke – acoustic piano (8), synthesizers (8)
- Luther "Mano" Hanes – Fender Rhodes (12), clavinet (12), organ (12)
- John "Jubu" Smith – guitars (2, 5, 10)
- Errol Cooney – guitars (3, 4, 6, 7)
- Ray Fuller – guitars (8)
- Keb' Mo' – lead guitar (10), vocals (10)
- Courtlan Clement – guitars (12)
- Rick Watford – guitars (12)
- Melvin Davis – bass (2-7, 10), fretless bass (11), arrangements (11)
- Larry Kimpel – bass (8)
- Akil Thompson – bass (12)
- Teddy Campbell – drums (2-5, 7, 8, 10, 11), arrangements (11)
- Dan Needham – drums (12)
- Michael White – percussion (2, 4, 6)
- Greg Smith – baritone saxophone (3, 7)
- Bob Sheppard – tenor saxophone (3, 7)
- Gerald Albright – alto saxophone (10), tenor saxophone (10), horn arrangements (10)
- Doug Moffett – baritone saxophone (12), tenor saxophone (12)
- Nick Lane – trombone (3, 7), horn arrangements (3, 7)
- Barry Green – trombone (12)
- Lee Thornburg – trumpet (3, 7)
- Christian Scott – trumpet (9)
- Vinnie Ciesielski – trumpet (12)
- Steve Patrick – trumpet (12)
- Lloyd Barry – horn arrangements (12)
- Phoenix Normand – backing vocals (2)
- Sara Williams – backing vocals (2)
- Kristle Murden – backing vocals (3, 4, 10)
- Carolyn Perry – backing vocals (3, 4, 10)
- Darlene Perry – backing vocals (3, 4, 10)

Strings (Tracks 3, 5 & 9)

- Nick Lane – arrangements and conductor
- Kevin Buck, Timothy Loo, Sarah O'Brien and Elizabeth Wilson – cello
- Charlie Bisharat, Susan Chatman, Mario DeLeon, Joel Derouin, Michele Richards and Josefina Vergara – violin

== Production ==
- Ledisi Young – executive producer, A&R direction, art direction
- Bill Darlington – executive producer, A&R direction, management
- Bruce Resinkoff – executive producer
- Dahlia Ambach-Caplin – A&R direction
- Evelyn Morgan – A&R administrator
- Deirdre Dooley – production coordinator
- Kimberly Hanes – production coordinator
- Ken Johnson – production coordinator
- Stacy Turner – production coordinator
- Lisa Hansen – release coordinator
- Andy Kman – release coordinator
- John Newcott – release coordinator
- Hollis King – art direction
- Sachico Asano – graphic design
- Beth Hertzhaft – photography

Technical credits

- Herb Powers Jr. – mastering at Powers House of Sound (New York, NY)
- Kim Burse – album sequencing
- John Lawry – Pro Tools editing
- Shannon Follin – recording (1)
- Ray Bardani – mixing (1-7, 9-12), recording (2-7, 9-11)
- Erik Zobler – recording (8), mixing (8)
- Danny Duncan – recording (12)
- Lisa Chamblee Hampton – assistant engineer
- Brendan Dekora – assistant engineer
- Grant Greene – assistant engineer
- George Gumbs – assistant engineer
- Luther "Mano" Hanes – assistant engineer
- Nick Sparks – assistant engineer
- Scott Velazco – assistant engineer

== Charts ==
Weekly chart performance for It's Christmas
Chart (2008)	Peak position
US Top Holiday Albums (Billboard)	5
US Top R&B/Hip-Hop Albums (Billboard)	28
