= Ledisi and Anibade Live Recordings Vol. 1 =

Ledisi & Anibade Live Recordings Vol. 1

Live album by Ledisi and Anibade
- Released: 2003
- Recorded: 2003
- Genres: R&B, jazz, soul
- Label: LeSun Music

Ledisi and Anibade chronology
Feeling Orange but Sometimes Blue (2002)	Ledisi & Anibade Live Recordings Vol. 1 (2003)	Lost & Found (2007)

Ledisi & Anibade Live Recordings Vol. 1 features live recording from singer, Ledisi and her band Anibade.

== Track listing ==
1. "I Can Dig It" (Live from Joe's Pub)
2. "Just Don't Wanna Be Lonely" (Live from Blue Note)
3. "Autumn Leaves" (Live from Yoshi's)
4. "Good Lovin'" (Live from Blue Note)
