= Piece of Me (disambiguation) =

"Piece of Me" is a 2007 song by Britney Spears.

Piece of Me, or A Piece of Me may also refer to:

- "Piece of Me", 1989 song by Skid Row from the album Skid Row.
- "A Piece of Me", a 2003 song by Luniz featuring Fat Joe.
- Britney: Piece of Me, a 2013–2017 concert residency by Britney Spears
- A Piece of Me, a 2015 EP by Jacob Whitesides
- "Piece of Me" (MK and Becky Hill song), 2016
- Piece of Me Tour, a 2018 concert tour by Britney Spears
- Piece of Me, 2022 album by Lady Wray

== See also ==
- Pieces of Me (disambiguation)
- "Peace of Me", a song by Natasha Bedingfield from the album Unwritten, 2004
