= High (Ledisi song) =

2017 single by Ledisi

Single by Ledisi

from the album Let Love Rule
- Released: May 12, 2017
- Recorded: 2017
- Studio: Unit 2 Studio (Hollywood, CA); Sonic Element Studio (Los Angeles, CA)
- Genre: trap
- Length: 4:12
- Label: Verve Forecast
- Songwriters: Darhyl Camper; Charles Hinshaw Jr.; Rex Rideout; Ledisi Young
- Producer: Darhyl Camper

Ledisi singles chronology
"Lose Control" (2015)	"High" (2017)	"Add to Me" (2017)

Music video
- "High" on YouTube

"High" is a song by American singer and songwriter Ledisi for her eighth studio album, Let Love Rule (2017). It was written by Ledisi, Charles Hinshaw Jr., Rex Rideout, and Darhyl Camper, with the latter producing the song. "High" was released on May 12, 2017, as the lead single for Let Love Rule.

The song was nominated for Best R&B Performance at the 60th Annual Grammy Awards in 2018.

== Development and release ==
The song was inspired by her "personal highs of the last year [2016]." In an interview with music and entertainment magazine Billboard, Ledisi stated, "I just felt high off of life. Everybody has their version of what high is for them. Mine happens to be what you hear on this song." "High" was one of the last songs to be recorded for Let Love Rule. The song combined a trap music instrumentation with R&B lyrics.

== Commercial performance ==
"High" debuted on the Adult R&B Songs chart during the week of June 17, 2017. During its seventeenth week, the song peaked at number seven on the chart during the week of October 14, 2017. "High" spent a total of twenty-one weeks on the Adult R&B Songs charts, its only entry on a Billboard chart.

== Music video ==
The music video for the song was directed by American director Noble Jones and shot on-location at the Pine & Crane restaurant in Los Angeles, California. Ledisi premiered the video on her YouTube channel on August 21, 2017. The song later aired on BET Soul.

The video opens with Ledisi walking down the street in a purple kimono as she passes by several street performers. A couple are also seen on a date and being high on love that they are floating in air. Two male dancers are also seen in a courtyard performing several choreographies and are eventually seen floating in the air. Ledisi is eventually meet her love interest at the end of video, resulting in her floating in the air and high on love.

== Live performances ==
Ledisi performed "High" during various public appearances, including the annual Black Girls Rock! award show, American syndicated talk show Harry, NPR Music's Tiny Desk. The song was a part of Ledisi's set list for her concert tour Let Love Rule Tour in 2018 and was the opening song for The Wild Card Tour in 2021. During the COVID-19 pandemic, Ledisi was unable to tour in the latter part of 2020. On September 12, 2020, she gave on a free virtual concert titled This One's for You: A Night of Ledisi Live. Audio from Ledisi's performance of "High" at the Troubadour in West Hollywood, California was released on her live album Ledisi Live at The Troubadour (2021). Once more, the song was included in the set list for The Good Life Tour (2024).
