= The Truth (Ledisi album) =

Studio album by Ledisi
- Released: March 11, 2014
- Recorded: 2013
- Genres: R&B, pop
- Length: 40:00
- Label: Verve
- Producers: Ledisi; Arden Altino; DJ Camper; Carvin & Ivan; Drumma Boy; Akene Dunkley; Jerry Duplessis; Chuck Harmony; Claude Kelly; Rex Rideout; Joe C. Ryan III; Jon Jon Traxx

Ledisi chronology
Pieces of Me (2011)	The Truth (2014)	The Intimate Truth (2015)

Singles from The Truth
- 1. "I Blame You" Released: September 30, 2013; 2. "Like This" Released: May 24, 2014; 3. "Lose Control" Released: March 14, 2015

The Truth is the seventh studio album by American singer-songwriter Ledisi. It was released on March 11, 2014, by Verve Records.

After the release of her previous album Pieces of Me (2011), Ledisi took a music hiatus to pursue acting roles, appearing in the films Leave It on the Floor (2011) and Selma (2014); the latter of which she portrayed American gospel singer Mahalia Jackson. She returned to music in 2013 and recorded the album in a brief period of time. The album saw the return of previous collaborations with songwriters and record producers Rex Rideout, Chuck Harmony, Claude Kelly; the latter two who produced "Pieces of Me", the lead single of the Ledisi's previous album Pieces of Me (2011). Harmony and Kelly also produced "I Blame You"; the lead single of The Truth.

The Truth was promoted in early 2014 by television performances and concert tours, including The Truth Tour (2014) and The Intimate Truth Tour (2015). The album received generally positive reviews by music critics. It was her third studio album to debut within the top-twenty on the US Billboard 200; along with Turn Me Loose (2009) and Pieces of Me (2011). The album spawned three singles–"I Blame You", "Like This", and "Lose Control". At the 57th Annual Grammy Awards (2015), "Like This" was nominated for Best R&B Performance.

== Recording and production ==
I wanted to go deeper into myself than I have. Before, I've sometimes hidden behind other storylines about someone else. When you look at yourself fully, it's hard. But it's also rewarding. I feel good about the person I've become not just on the outside but inside as well.

— Ledisi (Billboard Magazine interview)

Ledisi began recording the album in 2013. She recorded the album in a few months; the fastest timeframe in which she has a recorded an album in. During the recording of The Truth, Ledisi wrote about her own recent relationship experiences and describe the album as more personal than her previous albums. In an interview with NPR, she stated, "It's even more personal than any of the albums. I mean I am talking about not being in denial anymore about a relationship that wasn't working and it was a long relationship. I don't think letting go of a failing relationship is a bad thing. Sometime that's the whole point of The Truth is that letting go doesn't have to be sad love songs, letting go doesn't have to be a bad thing... it's a good thing."

Ledisi collaborated with songwriters and record producers that she worked on her previous album Pieces of Me (2011); including Claude Kelly, Chuck Harmony, Jon Jon Traxx, Carvin & Ivan, and long-time collaborator and executive producer of the album Rex Rideout. She also worked with Drumma Boy, Jerry Duplessis, Darhyl Camper, Angel Higgs, and Roland Jack. "I Blame You" uses a sample of All Night Long by the Mary Jane Girls. "Like This" uses a sample of "Zimba Ku" by Black Heat and "La Di Da Di" by Doug E. Fresh and Slick Rick.

== Release and promotion ==
On November 2, 2013, Ledisi announced the upcoming release of The Truth in an interview with Billboard magazine. On November 3, 2013, Ledisi debuted her single "I Blame You" in a performance at the annual Black Girls Rock! award show. Although the album was originally scheduled to be released on February 11, 2014, The Truth was released by Verve Forecast on March 11, 2014. A deluxe edition of the album was also released which included three additional songs. On March 13, 2014, Ledisi performed "I Blame You" on Late Show with David Letterman.

On May 22, 2014, Ledisi appeared on The Queen Latifah Show, where she did an interview and performed "Like This".

== Singles ==
"I Blame You" was released as the album's lead single on September 30, 2013. "I Blame You" peaked number fifty on the US Hot R&B/Hip-Hop Songs chart, only remaining on the chart for one week. The song was more successful on the other R&B charts. "I Blame You" peaked at number twenty-one on the Hot R&B Songs chart and number three on the Adult R&B Songs chart, remaining on the latter chart for thirty-eight weeks. The accompanying music video for "I Blame You", directed by Derek Blanks, premiered on Essence in December 2013.

On May 24, 2014, she released "Like This" as the second single. The music video for "Like This" was directed by Ron T. Young and was released to YouTube on September 16, 2014. The song peaked at number nine on the Adult R&B Songs chart. At the 57th Annual Grammy Awards in 2015, "Like This" received a Grammy Award nomination for Best R&B Performance. "Lose Control" was released the final single of the album on March 14, 2015. The song spent fifteen weeks on the US Adult R&B Songs chart, ultimately peaking at number twenty-one.

== Tour ==
In April 2014, Ledisi embarked on The Truth Tour. The tour was sponsored by Essence and visited thirty venues during its North American run. Ledisi later embarked on The Intimate Truth Tour to promote her live album The Intimate Truth (2015); an acoustic live recording of The Truth. During The Intimate Truth Tour, Ledisi performed acoustic versions of the songs from The Truth, in addition to songs from her previous albums.

== Critical reception ==
Professional ratings
Review scores
Source	Rating
AllMusic	4/5 stars
Rated R&B	3.9/5 stars

Music critic Andy Kellman of AllMusic referred to The Truth as "one of the singer and songwriter's best releases." Kellman praised the album for being "Succinct, consistent, vibrant, and all Ledisi all the time." Gulf News commented "Ledisi's voice is a multifaceted jewel that gives the album much of its sparkle: She's bold but never brash, scats without overtrilling and can curl your toes with the bending of a single note." Rated R&B's Lanetra King gave the album a rating of 3.9 of 5 stars stating, "Ledisi was able to deliver a decent album by expanding her horizons and evolving as an artist. Although there were no features on the album, Ledisi worked with additional producers giving her album a well-rounded tracklist and a handful of single worthy potentials."

Ken Capobianco of The Boston Globe stated, "Much of this, including the slow-burning "88 Boxes" and "Can't Help Who You Love," reflects a woman examining the meaning of relationships and rewriting the rules of love. She's not only looking for the happiness she wants but one she deserves. Of course, as with every Ledisi record, the vocalist is in complete command, serving the songs without grandstanding." Melody Charles of SoulTracks remarked "Every song has the lyrical presence. Just like any other union, there are moods and moments that speak to every aspect of a relationship or growing lack thereof.

=== Accolades ===
Awards and nominations for The Truth
Year	Award	Category	Nominee(s)	Result	Ref.
2015	Grammy Award	Best R&B Performance	"Like This"	Nominated	

== Commercial performance ==
In the United States, The Truth debuted at number fourteen on the Billboard 200, with first-week sales of 19,711 copies. The album tied with her previous album Turn Me Loose (2009) as her second-highest debut the Billboard 200, behind her album Pieces of Me (2011), respectively. The Truth spent twelve weeks on the chart before dropping off the Billboard 200 chart. The album peaked at number six on the US Top R&B/Hip-Hop Albums chart, spending a total of twenty-six weeks on the chart. The Truth debuted at number four on the Top R&B Albums chart, spending a total of twenty-two weeks on the chart. By August 2014, the album sold over 77,000 copies.

== Track listing ==
No.	Title	Writer(s)	Producer(s)	Length
1.	"I Blame You"	Charles T. Harmon; Claude Kelly; Ledisi Young	Chuck Harmony; Kelly	4:14
2.	"Rock With You"	Arden Altino; Christopher Gholson; Jerry Duplessis; Johntá Austin; Young	Drumma Boy; Duplessis; Altino^{[A]}	3:24
3.	"That Good Good"	Angel Higgs; John Webb, Jr.; Young	Kelly; Jon Jon Traxx	3:17
4.	"Lose Control"	Joe C. Ryan III; Young; Rex Rideout; Roland Jack	Joe C. Ryan III; Rideout	4:39
5.	"Like This"	Young; Rideout; Joe C. Ryan III	Rideout • Joe C. Ryan III	3:48
6.	"Anything"	Kelly; Webb; Young	Kelly; Jon Jon Traxx	4:36
7.	"The Truth"	Daryhl "Hey DJ" Camper; Webb; Young	Camper	4:27
8.	"Missy Doubt"	Joe C. Ryan III; Young; Rideout	Rideout; Joe C. Ryan III^{[A]}	3:57
9.	"88 Boxes"	Ivan Barias; Young	Carvin & Ivan	4:19
10.	"Can't Help Who You Love"	Altino; Akene Dunkley; Chrisette Michele; Duplessis; Young; Paul Pesco; Stacy Barthe	Duplessis; Dunkley^{[A]}; Altino^{[A]}	3:18

Deluxe edition bonus tracks
No.	Title	Writer(s)	Producer(s)	Length
11.	"Mine"	Ryan; Young; Rideout	Rideout; Joe C. Ryan III	4:04
12.	"I Swear"	Carvin Haggins; Barias; Johnnie Smith; Young	Carvin & Ivan	3:49
13.	"Quick Fix"	Webb; Young	Jon Jon Traxx	3:32

Notes

^{^[A]} denotes co-producer

== Charts ==
=== Weekly charts ===
Chart (2014)	Peak position
US Billboard 200	14
US Top R&B Albums (Billboard)	4
US Top R&B/Hip-Hop Albums (Billboard)	6

=== Year-end charts ===
Chart (2014)	Position
US Top R&B/Hip-Hop Albums (Billboard)	49

== Release history ==
List of release dates, showing region, formats, label and reference
Region	Date	Format	Label	Ref.
Various	March 11, 2014	CD; digital download	Verve Records	
