= Hampton Jazz Festival =

Annual jazz music festival in Hampton, Virginia, USA

The Hampton Jazz Festival is a major musical event started in 1968, and features many of the world's major jazz artists. It is held during the last full weekend in June each year, with the primary venue being Hampton, Virginia's Hampton Coliseum. Festival organizers describe it as "the best available jazz, R&B and blues artists that are on tour during the time of the festival... packaged at a reasonable price." In 2024 it was re-branded as the Hampton Jazz & Music Festival, with an emphasis on a broader range of musical acts.

The Hampton Jazz Festival began in 1968 as a way to highlight great jazz. Held in the Hampton Coliseum the last full weekend in June, the annual event has hosted virtually every major jazz artist alive.

In the inaugural year, featured artists included Count Basie, Gary Burton, Dizzy Gillespie, Ramsey Lewis, Herbie Mann Quintet, Thelonious Monk Quartet, Wes Montgomery, Dionne Warwick, and Muddy Waters. 1969, the second year, brought such notables as Booker T & the MGs, George Benson Quartet, Dave Brubeck Trio with Gerry Mulligan, Ray Charles, Miles Davis, Gary Davis, Duke Ellington Orchestra, Sly and the Family Stone, and Herbie Hancock.

In honor of the festival's 50th anniversary in 2017, pianist Ramsey Lewis returned to represent the lineup from the inaugural event.

The COVID-19 pandemic caused the festival to go on hiatus from 2020-2022, but it returned in 2023.

== History ==
- 1968 - The Original Tuxedo Jazz Band, Cannonball Adderley, Count Basie, Gary Burton, Dizzy Gillespie, Dizzy Gillespie Quintet, Earl "Fatha" Hines, Skip James, Ramsey Lewis, Herbie Mann Quintet, Thelonious Monk Quartet, Archie Shepp Quintet, Nina Simone Trio, Willie Smith, Jimmie Smith, Dionne Warwick, Muddy Waters and his Blues Band, Staple Singers, Mongo Santamaria (filling in for Wes Montgomery, who was scheduled to perform but died shortly before the festival)
- 1969 - United House of Prayer Choir, Young-Holt Unlimited, Booker T & the MGs, George Benson Quartet, Dave Brubeck Trio with Gerry Mulligan, Ray Charles, Miles Davis, Gary Davis, Duke Ellington Orchestra, Herbie Hancock, Roland Kirk Sextet, Nina Simone and Quartet, Sly and the Family Stone, Marian Williams, Sun Ra and Solar Arkestra, Cannonball Adderley
- 1970 - Gene Ammons and Sonny Stitt, Kenny Burrell, Miles Davis, Roberta Flack, Eddie Harris, Herbie Mann, Les McCann, Mongo Santamaria, Jimmy Smith, Sarah Vaughan
- 1971 - Cannonball Adderley, Dave Brubeck, Billy Eckstine, Roberta Flack, Erroll Garner, B. B. King, Rahsaan Roland Kirk, Hubert Laws, Herbie Mann, Jerry Mulligan, Buddy Rich, Leon Thomas, Dizzy Gillespie
- 1972 - Art Blakey, Dave Brubeck Trio, Kenny Burrell, Ray Charles, Paul Desmond, Dizzy Gillespie, Roy Haynes, Illinois Jacquet, B. B. King, Herbie Mann, Al McKibbon, Thelonious Monk, Gerry Mulligan, Joe Newman, Nina Simone, Zoot Sims, Jimmy Smith, Sonny Stitt, Clark Terry, The Giants of Jazz, Kai Winding, Cannonball Adderley
- 1973 - Duke Ellington & His Orchestra, Donny Hathaway, Freddie Hubbard, B. B. King, Rahsaan Roland Kirk, Charles Mingus, The Staple Singers, War, Jimmy Witherspoon, Stevie Wonder
- 1974 - Donald Byrd, Aretha Franklin, Stan Getz, Elvin Jones, B.B. King, Gladys Knight & the Pips, The Crusaders, The Spinners, Sarah Vaughan
- 1975 - Bobby Bland, Donald Byrd & the Blackbirds, Bobby Humphrey, B.B. King, Ramsey Lewis, Herbie Mann, Jack McDuff, New Birth, Staples Singers, The Isley Brothers, The Stylistics, Stanley Turrentine, McCoy Tyner
- 1976 - Count Basie & Orchestra, Archie Bell & the Drells, Brecker Brothers, Sons of Champlin, George Duke, Marvin Gaye, Bill Cobham/George Duke Band, Dizzy Gillespie, Harold Melvin & the Blue Notes, Teddy Pendergrass, The Crusaders, Joe Williams, Nancy Wilson
- 1977 - Roy Ayers, Gato Barberie, Natalie Cole, Thad Jones-Mel Lewis, Gladys Knight & the Pips, Chuck Mangione, Lou Rawls, Tavares, Stanley Turrentine, Jimmie Walker
- 1978 - Ashford & Simpson, Brick, George Duke & the Duke Ellington Orchestra, Al Jarreau, B.B. King, Gladys Knight & the Pips, Yusef Lateef, LTD, Noel Pointer, Flora Purim with Airto, Grover Washington, Jr. & Locksmith
- 1979 - 24th Street Band, Ashford & Simpson, George Benson, Peabo Bryson, Chic, A Tribute to Ella Fitzgerald, Ella Fitzgerald, Dexter Gordon, Spyro Gyra, Etta James, Joe Jones, Ronnie Laws, Ramsey Lewis, The Crusaders, Grover Washington, Jr.
- 1980 - Bobby "Blue" Bland, Angela Bofill, Chic, Lou Donaldson, Herbie Hancock, Phyllis Hyman, Kool and the Gang, Ronnie Laws, Peaches & Herb, Sam and Dave, The Brothers Johnson, Dionne Warwick
- 1981 - Jerry Butler, Hank Crawford, Spyro Gyra, Herbie Hancock Quartet, B.B. King, Gerry Mulligan, Smokey Robinson, The Crusaders, The O'Jays, Mel Torme, McCoy Tyner, Nancy Wilson
- 1982 - Count Basie, George Benson, Frankie Beverly & Maze, Angela Bofill, Heath Brothers, Ron Carter, Betty Carter, George Duke, Herbie Hancock, Dr. John with Hank Crawford, Joe Henderson, Millie Jackson, Hubert Laws, Herbie Mann, Wynton Marsalis, Bobby McFerrin, Carmen McRae, Dave "Fathead" Newman, Oscar Peterson, Pieces of a Dream, Jean-Luc Ponty, Patrice Rushen, Woody Shaw, Sarah Vaughan, Junior Walker & the All-Stars, Tony Williams
- 1983 - James Brown, Ron Carter, Dazz Band, Roberta Flack, Herbie Hancock & VSOP II, Eddie Harris Quartet, Phyllis Hyman, Etta Jones, Kool & the Gang, Wynton Marsalis, Branford Marsalis, Houston Person, Lou Rawls, The O'Jays, Luther Vandross, Rudy West & The Keys, Tony Williams
- 1984 - Bob James, Al Jarreau, B.B. King, Gladys Knight & the Pips, Patti LaBelle, Tania Marie, Les McCann, Pieces of a Dream, Pointer Sisters, David Sanborn, Shirley Scott, Jae Sinnett, Stanley Turrentine
- 1985 - Roy Ayres, Andrae Crouch, Jeff Lorber, Fusion, Spyro Gyra, Patti LaBelle, Jimmy McGriff, Melba Moore, Jeffrey Osborne, Nina Simone, The Clark Sisters, The Commodores, The Manhattans, Stevie Ray Vaughan
- 1986 - Anita Baker, Natalie Cole, the Four Tops, George Howard, B.B. King, Midnight Star, Stephanie Mills, O.T.B., Rene and Angela, Starpoint, The Dells, The Temptations
- 1987 - Larry Carlton, Ray Charles, Roberta Flack, Stan Getz, Phyllis Hyman, Freddie Jackson, Stanley Jordan, Gladys Knight & the Pips, Wynton Marsalis, Neville Brothers, The Crusaders, Grover Washington, Jr.
- 1988 - Gerald Albright, George Benson, Miles Davis, Miki Howard, Al Jarreau, Kenny G, B. B. King, Dianne Reeves, Jae Sinnett, Super Jazz Band, Dionne Warwick
- 1989 - Larry Carlton, Ray Charles, Hank Crawford, Lou Donaldson, Spyro Gyra, Jimmy McGriff, David (Fathead) Newman, Arthur Prysock, Dianne Reeves, David Sanborn, Diane Schuur & the Count Basie Orchestra, Take Six, The O'Jays, Sarah Vaughan, Grover Washington, Jr., Be Be & Ce Ce Winans
- 1990 - New York Voices, Patti Austin, Regina Belle, George Benson, Roberta Flack, Dizzy Gillespie UN Orchestra, GRP All-Stars, Hiroshima, Marlon Jordan, Patti LaBelle, Pieces of a Dream, Lee Ritenour, the Four Tops, McCoy Tyner
- 1991 - Regina Belle, Frankie Beverly & Maze, Ruth Brown, George Duke, Al Green, Gladys Knight, Mighty Clouds of Joy, Najee, Neville Brothers, Jeffrey Osborne, Plunky & Oneness, Diane Reeves, David Sanborn, Dionne Warwick
- 1992 - Gerald Albright, Count Basie Orchestra, Frankie Beverly with Maze, Ray Charles, Ella Fitzgerald, Aretha Franklin, Manhattan Transfer, O'Jays & Whispers, Grover Washington, Jr.
- 1993 - Regina Belle, Peabo Bryson, Jazz Explosion Super Band, Kenny G, Patti LaBelle, Stephanie Mills, Smokey Robinson & The Yellowjackets
- 1994 - Gerald Albright, Count Basie Orchestra, George Duke & The Jazz Explosion, the Four Tops, Lalah Hathaway, B.B. King, Earl Klugh, Gladys Knight, Patti LaBelle, Ramsey Lewis, Little Richard, Connie Parker Trio
- 1995 - Cleo Lane & John Dankworth, Gerald Albright, Patti Austin, Anita Baker, George Benson, Frankie Beverly & Maze, Ray Charles, Earth, Wind & Fire, Duke Ellington Orchestra, Al Jarreau, Jazz Explosion, Gladys Knight, Stanley Turrentine, Grover Washington, Jr.
- 1996 - Jonathan Butler, Joe De Francesco, Rachelle Ferrell, Herbie Hancock, Isaac Hayes, Isley Brothers, Millie Jackson, Ahmad Jamal, Chaka Khan, Harold Melvin & the Blue Notes, Chick Corea's Salute to Bud Powell, David Sanborn, Luther Vandross, Grover Washington, Jr., Barry White
- 1997 - Regina Belle, George Benson, Frankie Beverly & Maze, Peabo Bryson, Robert Cray and the Memphis Horns, Tower of Power, Will Downing, Kirk Franklin & the Family, Kenny G, B.B. King, Gladys Knight, Patti LaBelle, Pieces of a Dream, Dianne Reeves, Solo
- 1998 - Mary J. Blige, Fourplay, Aretha Franklin, Boney James, Jazz Crusaders All-Stars, LSG, Brian McKnight, The Whispers, Grover Washington, Jr.
- 1999 - Gerald Alston/w Manhattans, Average White Band, George Benson, George Duke/Sounds of Soul, Kevin Eubanks, Faith Evans, Rachelle Ferrell/Sounds of Soul, Boney James, Chaka Khan, Patti LaBelle, Kenny Lattimore/Sounds of Soul, Blue Lovett /w Manhattans, Ohio Players, Grover Washington, Jr.
- 2000 - Roy Ayers, Erykah Badu, Regina Belle, Kirk Franklin & Nu Nation, Roy Hargrove Quintet, Gladys Knight, Ellis Marsalis Quartet, Jeffrey Osborne, Sinbad, The O'Jays, Stanley Turrentine, Sunghee Stepak, Kirk Whalum
- 2001 - George Benson, Frankie Beverly w/ Maze, Norman Brown, Brian Culbertson, Miki Howard, Boney James, Dave Koz, Brian McKnight, Stephanie Mills, Najee, Connie Parker, Jill Scott, The Temptations, The Whispers
- 2002 - The Stylistics, The Chi-Lites, Harold Melvin's Blue Notes, Dave Koz, Norman Brown, Brian Culbertson, James Ingram, Patti LaBelle, Oleta Adams, Fourplay, Stephanie Mills, O'Jays, Maze featuring Frankie Beverly, Teena Marie, The Gap Band
- 2003 - Anita Baker, Earth, Wind & Fire, India.Arie, Gladys Knight, Maze featuring Frankie Beverly, George Benson, Michael McDonald, The Isley Brothers featuring Ronald Isley, The Crusaders featuring special guest Randy Crawford, Rick Braun, Kirk Whalum, Norman Brown, David Sanborn, The Jeff Golub Band, The Dramatics, Ray, Goodman & Brown, The Manhattans, The Harold Blanchard Trio
- 2004 - Gladys Knight, Patti LaBelle, Stephanie Mills, The Gap Band, Dave Koz and Friends featuring Rick Braun, Jonathan Butler and Wayman Tisdale, Gerald Levert, The East Coast All-Stars featuring Chuck Loeb, Alex Bugnon, Bill Evans, Will Lee and Omar Hakim, Dells, Chilites, The Intruders, Kool and the Gang, Kem, Floetry
- 2005 - Hot Summer Nights featuring Al Jarreau, Boney James & Yolanda Adams, Al Green, Maze featuring Frankie Beverly, Ruben Studdard, Guitars & Saxes featuring Mindi Abair, Warren Hill, Jeff Golub & Wayman Tisdale, Angie Stone, Earl Kluge, Ashford & Simpson, Jazz Attack featuring Rick Braun, Jonathan Butler, Richard Elliot & Peter White, Chris Botti
- 2006 - Maze featuring Frankie Beverly, B.B. King, Toni Braxton, The Original Superstars Of Jazz Fusion featuring Roy Ayers, Jean Carne, Wayne Henderson, Bobbi Humphrey, Ronnie Laws, Jon Lucien & Lonnie Liston Smith, Charlie Wilson, Will Downing, Kem, Boney James, Groovin' For Grover featuring Kirk Whalum, Gerald Albright & Jeff Lorber, Kindred: The Family Soul
- 2007 - Patti LaBelle, Jill Scott, Maze featuring Frankie Beverly, George Benson, David Sanborn, Tower of Power, Norman Brown's Summer Storm featuring Peabo Bryson, Jeff Lorber & Marion Meadows, The Dizzy Gillespie All-Star Big Band featuring Slide Hampton, Roberta Gambarini, James Moody, Jimmy Heath, Roy Hargrove, Claudio Roditi and Antonio Hart, Stephanie Mills, Ramsey Lewis Trio
- 2008 - Gladys Knight, Jill Scott, Maze featuring Frankie Beverly, Boney James & Jonathan Butler, Raheem DeVaughn, Chrisette Michele, Kenny G, KEM, Joss Stone, Dave Koz & Friends featuring Peabo Bryson
- 2009 - Kenny "Babyface" Edmonds, The O'Jays, Patti LaBelle, George Benson, Ledisi, Jazz Attack featuring Jonathan Butler, Richard Elliot and Rick Braun, Michael McDonald, Fantasia, Forte Jazz Band featuring Brian Pinner, Robin Thicke, Chuck Brown, Keiko Matsui
- 2010 - Gladys Knight, Charlie Wilson, Maze featuring Frankie Beverly, Keith Sweat, Dave Koz & Jonathan Butler with special guest Sheila E., Melanie Fiona, Teena Marie, Joe, Down to the Bone, En Vogue, SAX for STAX featuring Gerald Albright & Kirk Whalum, The Fuzz Band
- 2011 - Chaka Khan, Charlie Wilson, Boyz II Men, Boney James, Anthony Hamilton, Maze featuring Frankie Beverly, KEM, Chrisette Michele, Soul of Summer featuring Jonathan Butler, eric Darius & Maysa, Stephanie Mills, David Sanborn, George Duke & Marcus Miller, Laura Izibor
- 2012 - Charlie Wilson, Kenny G, Jill Scott, Natalie Cole, Norman Brown & Gerald Albright, Alex Boyd, Monica, Ledisi, Will Downing, KEM, Dave Koz & Candy Dulfer, RaJazz
- 2013 - Gladys Knight, The O'Jays, KEM, Leela James, Bobby Brown, Ralph Tresvant, Johnny Gill, Fantasia, George Benson, Forte Jazz Band featuring Brian Pinner, Jill Scott, TGT, Karla Crump, Bob James & David Sanborn featuring Steve Gadd and James Genius
- 2014- Charlie Wilson, Jaheim, Jonathan Butler, Norman Brown, Alex Bugnon, Jackie Scott & the Housewreckers, William "Mobetta" Ledbetter, O'Jays, Chaka Khan, Morris Day & the Time, Spyro Gyra, Toni Braxton, Babyface, Dave Koz & Friends (Mindi Abair, Gerald Albright, Richard Elliott), The Now & Then Trio + One
- 2015 - Jill Scott, Frankie Beverly and Maze, Jennifer Hudson, Trombone Shorty and Orleans Avenue, Avery Sunshine, Eric Benet, KEM, The Whispers, Fantasia, BWB (Norman Brown, Kirk Whalum, Rick Braun), the Unifics, the Myra Smith Experience
- 2016 - Gladys Knight, Trombone Shorty & Orleans Avenue, Michael McDonald, Leela James, Babyface, New Edition, Judith Hill, Forte Jazz Band, Charlie Wilson, Stephanie Mills, Boney James, Joselyn Best
- 2017 - Jill Scott, KEM, Brian Culbertson, Gerald Albright, Jonathan Butler, the O'Jays, Fantasia, Anthony Hamilton, West Coast Jam (Richard Elliot, Rick Braun, Norman Brown), Maze featuring Frankie Beverly, Patti LaBelle, Ramsey Lewis, Bobby "Blackhat" Walters
- 2018 - Charlie Wilson, Maze featuring Frankie Beverly, Kenny G, Boyz II Men, Con Funk Shun, Lalah Hathaway, Gregory Porter, Jazmine Sullivan, Lakeside, Avery*Sunshine, Xscap3, Kustom Made
- 2019 - Ashley Felder, Najee with special guest Eric Roberson, Tamia, Maxwell, The Bar-Kays, Will Downing & Maysa, Anthony Hamilton, KEM, Gerald & Selina Albright, Ledisi, Babyface, Maze featuring Frankie Beverly
- 2020-22 - No festival due to Covid-19 pandemic.
- 2023 - Anthony Hamilton, Stephanie Mills, Charlie Wilson, Fantasia, Babyface, Trombone Shorty and Orleans Avenue, Chris Botti, Jonathan Butler, Chuck Brown Band, Kenny G, Peter White
- 2024 - Special EFX All-Stars, Christone "Kingfish" Ingram, Ledisi, KEM, Angelica Baylor & Trey Jones Experience, Boney James, Coco Jones, Boyz II Men, The Fuzz Band, October London, Brian Culbertson, Jon Batiste.
