= B.G.T.Y. Tour =

2012 concert tour by Ledisi

- Tour by Ledisi
- Promotional poster for the tour
- Location: North America
- Associated album: Pieces of Me
- Start date: June 24, 2012
- End date: August 5, 2012
- Legs: 1
- No. of shows: 27

Ledisi concert chronology
- Pieces of Me Tour (2011); B.G.T.Y. Tour (2012); The Truth Tour (2014)

The B.G.T.Y. (Be Good to Yourself) Tour was the second headlining tour by American singer Ledisi, in support of her fifth studio Pieces of Me (2011). The tour began in Hampton, Virginia on June 23 at the Hampton Jazz Festival and ended in Atlanta on August 5.

== Background and development ==
In an interview with lifestyle magazine Essence, Ledisi announced the B.G.T.Y. (Be Good to Yourself) Tour. The tour began on June 23rd at the Hampton Jazz Festival in Hampton, Virginia. In April 2012, WTLC-FM offered a presale code for the show in Indianapolis on August 1, 2012. During each concert, Ledisi featured four different wardrobe outfits including a silver sequin mini-dress inspired by Tina Turner's dress in Mad Max Beyond Thunderdome.

== Critical reception ==
Kenya Vaughn of The St. Louis American praised Ledisi for being able to get the audience to participate. Vaughn commented, "By the third song in at Ledisi’s set of her BGTY (Be Good To Yourself) Tour at the Pageant Friday night, she had the crowd of a thousand-plus in the palm of her hands. As the chorus commanded in her radio hit “Bravo,” Ledisi fans were obedient to say the least as they fervently clapped and their bodies throbbed to the pulsing track and infectious keyboard riff by St. Louis own Joshua Webb". She further praised the show by stating "Ledisi's presence in St. Louis was justified to say the least – and her performance evidence that she may finally be on her way to a warranted position of R&B diva/soul icon-in-training." Mary Colurso of Advance Local commented that "Her versatility was much on display, along with a warm personality. Between numbers, Ledisi exuded a “just friends” vibe, joking with the audience as if she were a homegirl, instead of a star on tour."

The Philadelphia Inquirer's Tanisha Alston wrote, "Dazzling in a silver sequined mini with the energy of a sultry Tina Turner, Ledisi presented a take-that! version (complete with megaphone) of "Shut Up" her musical ode to naysayers. As she sang the self-congratulatory lyrics of "Bravo," Ledisi stomped, shimmied, and shook her way across the stage, prompting the audience to join in repeating her self-affirming chant, "I'm winning every day."

== Opening acts ==
- Eric Benét
- Chrisette Michele (select dates)

== Set list ==
- Video Intro I
1. "Say No"
2. "Shut Up"
3. "Bravo"
- Background Singers Intro ("You & Me" Medley)
4. "So Into You"
5. "Stay Together"
6. "Coffee"
7. "In the Morning"
- Video Intro II / "Higher Ground" Medley
8. "Higher than This"
9. "Think of You"
10. "B.G.T.Y."
11. "Pieces of Me"
12. "Alright"
13. "What A Wonderful World"
- Video Outro

== Tour dates ==
Date	City	Venue
North America
June 23, 2012	Hampton	Hampton Jazz Festival
June 24, 2012	Philadelphia	Keswick Theatre
June 26, 2012	Boston	Wilbur Theater
June 27, 2012	New York City	Beacon Theater
June 29, 2012	Baltimore	Pier Six Concert Pavilion
June 30, 2012	Greensboro	White Oak Amphitheatre
July 1, 2012	Charlotte	Knight Theater
July 3, 2012	Myrtle Beach	House of Blues
July 5, 2012	Houston	Arena Theater
July 6, 2012	Dallas	Majestic Theater
July 8, 2012	Birmingham	Alys Stephens Center
July 11, 2012	Omaha	Omaha Music Hall
July 12, 2012	Chicago	Country Club Hills
July 13, 2012	St. Louis	The Pageant
July 14, 2012	Memphis	Orpheum Theatre
July 15, 2012	Kansas City	Midland Theatre
July 18, 2012	San Diego	Humphrey's
July 19, 2012	Los Angeles	Club Nokia
July 21, 2012	Oakland	Jazz Fest @ The Bay
July 22, 2012	Sacramento	Woodlake Inn
July 25, 2012	Washington, D.C.	Constitution Hall
July 26, 2012	Cleveland	House of Blues
July 28, 2012	Detroit	Chene Park
July 29, 2012	Buffalo	Kleinhans Music Hall
August 1, 2012	Indianapolis	Old National Centre
August 4, 2012	St. Petersburg	Mahaffey Theater
August 5, 2012	Atlanta	Chastain Park Amphitheater
