= Pieces of Me (Ledisi album) =

Studio album by Ledisi
- Released: June 14, 2011
- Recorded: 2010–11
- Genre: R&B
- Length: 45:47
- Label: Verve Forecast
- Producers: Ledisi; Carvin & Ivan; Mike City; Koshah Daniels; Paperboy Fabeeout; Chuck Harmony; KayGee; Claude Kelly; Balewa Muhammad; Phatboiz; Salaam Remi; Rex Rideout; Jon Jon Traxx

Ledisi chronology
Turn Me Loose (2009)	Pieces of Me (2011)	The Truth (2014)

Singles from Pieces of Me
- 1. "Pieces of Me" Released: April 5, 2011; 2. "So Into You" Released: June 14, 2011; 3. "Stay Together" Released: July 9, 2011; 4. "Bravo" Released: February 18, 2012

Pieces of Me is the sixth studio album by American singer-songwriter Ledisi. It was released on June 14, 2011, by Verve Forecast Records.

Following a career hiatus which reignited her creativity, Ledisi was inspired to produce a record with a basis in traditional rhythm and blues that stood apart from contemporary pop. Her collaborations with songwriters and record producers Chuck Harmony, Claude Kelly and Rex Rideout produced a mellower tone, developing diverse vocal styles and influences from funk, hip-hop, and soul music. Severing professional ties with her manager Bill Darlington and Mark Kaplan, Ledisi eschewed the music of her previous releases in favor of an intimate, personal album. Lyrical themes of Pieces of Me emphasize monogamy, female empowerment and self-reflection, a result of Ledisi considering a maturer message to contend artistic credibility.

Pieces of Me was promoted in mid-2011 by television performances and concert tours, such as Ledisi's debut headlining Pieces of Me Tour. The album received generally positive reviews by music critics. It was her first studio album to debut within the top-ten on the US Billboard 200, and it also reached number two on Top R&B/Hip-Hop Albums chart. The album spawned four singles–"Pieces of Me", "So Into You", "Stay Together", and "Bravo". At the 54th Annual Grammy Awards (2012), Pieces of Me was nominated for Best R&B Album.

== Background ==
In 2011, Ledisi changed her management to Kevin Gasser and John Dee of Benchmark Entertainment.

== Recording and production ==
People are starting to know what I’m capable of doing but they still don’t know who I am. ‘Pieces of Me’ is more personal; I’m not hiding in the music. I’m growing more confident and stronger in my own lane. I’m just going for it.

— Ledisi (Billboard Magazine interview)

Ledisi began recording the album in late 2010. She recorded majority of the album at various studios in California including Entourage Studios, Glenwood Studios, NuSoul Productions, Vanilla Sky Studios, and White Lightning Studio. Describe as her most personal album, Ledisi executive produced the album along with long-time music collaborator Rex Rideout. In an interview with Billboard, Rideout stated "The challenge overall was to keep her individuality and message but increase the commercial appeal; to give the audience a slice of the dynamic performer that she is."

She collaborated with songwriters and record producers that she had never worked in the past, including Salaam Remi, KayGee, Mike City, Chuck Harmony, Claude Kelly, and Jon Jon Traxx. The album's production also saw the return of production duo Carvin & Ivan. She also worked with John Legend, who co-wrote "I Miss You Now". Jaheim appeared on the duet "Stay Together". Chuck Harmony, who co-produced the song "Pieces of Me", told Billboard magazine, "She's on her way to the mainstream. It's a radio-friendly record with a singalong kind of melody that works with her powerful, clear voice."

== Release and promotion ==
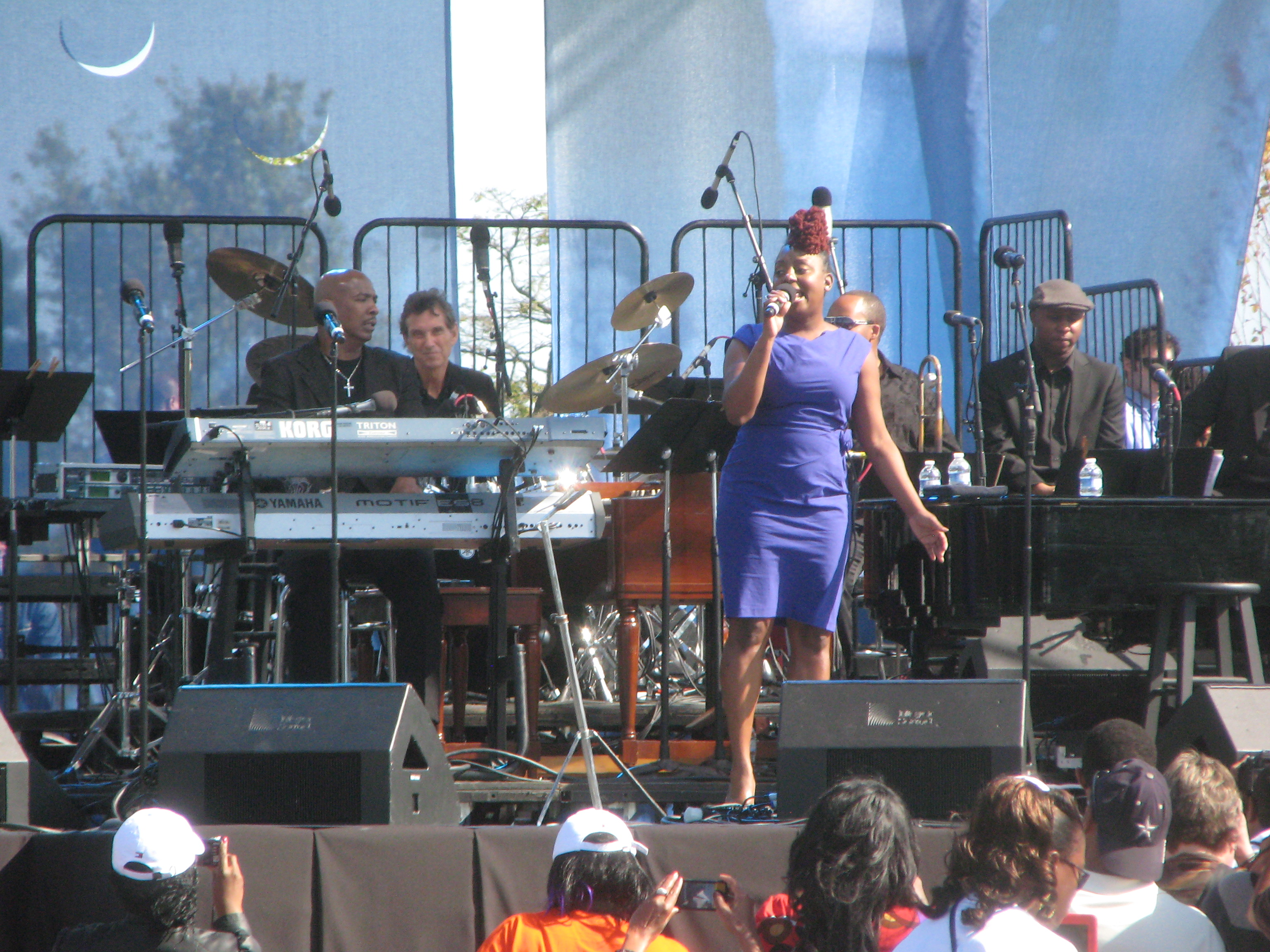
Ledisi performing at the Martin Luther King Jr. Memorial dedication concert (October 2011)

In May 2011, Ledisi appeared on the Tom Joyner Morning Show to announced the upcoming release of Pieces of Me. She also performed the lead single "Pieces of Me" and "Alright". On June 13, 2011, Ledisi performed "Pieces of Me" on Late Night with Jimmy Fallon. On the same day, she performed a brief concert on BET music video show 106 & Park. Pieces of Me was released by Verve Forecast on June 14, 2011. A deluxe edition of the album was released which includes the track list of the standard edition and two additional songs; a song titled "Simple" and an acoustic version of "Turn Me Loose". A special iTunes version of the album was also released which includes the standard track list and a song titled "One Step Ahead". A free app store application was released on the same day which featured two games; one that ties into the album cover's puzzle motif and the second game which allowed users to blend Ledisi's hairstyle on their own picture.

On the same day of June 14, Ledisi appeared on The Mo'Nique Show and performed her song "Shut Up". Ledisi performed at the annual Essence Music Festival on July 7, 2012. On July 17, 2011, she performed a brief set list of songs from the album on Walmart Soundcheck. In November 2011, she appeared on Verses & Flow to perform "Pieces of Me".

== Singles ==
The album's titled-track "Pieces of Me" was released as the album's lead single on April 5, 2011. "Pieces of Me" attempted to crossover on the pop chart but only reached number 114 on the Billboard Hot 100. The song was more successful on the R&B charts. "Pieces of Me" peaked at number nineteen on the Hot R&B/Hip-Hop Songs chart and number two on the Adult R&B Songs chart. The accompanying music video for "Pieces of Me", directed by Nzingha Stewart, was released to YouTube on June 13, 2011. At the 54th Annual Grammy Awards, "Pieces of Me" received two Grammy Award nominations: a nomination for Best R&B Song and Best R&B Performance. The song also earned a gold certification by the RIAA.

On June 14, 2011, she released "So Into You" as the second single. Although the song failed to chart, the music video for "So Into You" which was directed by Erica D. Hayes, was released to YouTube on September 19, 2011. "Stay Together", a duet with Jaheim, was released as a radio-only single in July 2011. The song peaked at number four on the Adult R&B Songs chart and twenty-three on the Hot R&B/Hip-Hop Songs chart. In February 2012, Ledisi released "Bravo" as the album's final single. The song charted at number fifty-four on the Hot R&B/Hip-Hop Songs chart and number twelve on Adult R&B Songs chart. The accompanying music video for "Bravo", directed by Erica D. Hayes, was released on March 12, 2012.

== Tour ==
In February 2011, Ledisi toured as the opening act of American singer Kem's Intimacy Tour. After the tour concluded in July 2011, Ledisi prepared for her first headlining concert tour. In October 2011, she embarked on her debut concert tour the Pieces of Me Tour. The tour visited twenty-seven venues during its North American and European run. After the Pieces of Me Tour concluded in January 2012, Ledisi took a brief hiatus before embarking on the B.G.T.Y. Tour in June 2012.

== Critical reception ==
Professional ratings
Aggregate scores
Source	Rating
Metacritic	75/100
Review scores
Source	Rating
AllMusic	3.5/5 stars
Entertainment Weekly	B
Los Angeles Times	3/5 stars
PopMatters	6/10

Metacritic gave the album 75 out of 100 based on 6 critic reviews as of June 2011. AllMusic's Andy Kellman found that songs such as “Hate Me” is "a hot Southern soul ballad and “Shut Up” packs forthright attitude with a roomy but unshakeable beat, yet the album does not quite have the bite of Turn Me Loose. It could use a couple throw-you-around-the-room rockers in the vein of Turn Me Loose's “Runnin’” and “Knockin’,” although some listeners will be so struck by the sustained high level of confidence and grace that it won’t be an issue." Evelyn McDonnell of the Los Angeles Times gave the album a three star rating, stating, "the deployment of clichéd lyrics and programmatic rhythm tracks undermines her message of determined individualism."

=== Accolades ===
Awards and nominations for Pieces of Me
Year	Award	Category	Nominee(s)	Result	Ref.
2012	Grammy Award	Best R&B Album	Pieces of Me	Nominated	
2012	Grammy Award	Best R&B Song	"Pieces of Me"	Nominated	
2012	Grammy Award	Best R&B Performance	"Pieces of Me"	Nominated	

== Commercial performance ==
In the United States, Pieces of Me debuted at number eight on the Billboard 200, with first-week sales of 36,298 copies. This gave Ledisi her first album to debut in the top ten on the Billboard 200 album chart. The album spent twenty-two weeks on the chart before dropping off the Billboard chart. The album peaked at number two on the US Top R&B/Hip-Hop Albums chart, spending a total of sixty-seven weeks on the chart. Pieces of Me also spent one week on the US Indie Store Album Sales chart. As of 2013, Pieces of Me has sold over 267,000 copies.

== Track listing ==
No.	Title	Writer(s)	Producer(s)	Length
1.	"Pieces of Me"	Charles T. Harmon; Claude Kelly; Ledisi Young	Chuck Harmony; Kelly	3:23
2.	"So Into You"	Darrell Crooks; Young; Rex Rideout	Ledisi; Rideout	3:47
3.	"Bravo"	Kelly; John Webb, Jr.	Kelly; Jon Jon Traxx	3:29
4.	"Stay Together" (featuring Jaheim)	Young; Rideout	Ledisi; Rideout	3:56
5.	"Coffee"	Koshah E. Daniels; Keir Gist; Balewa Muhammad; Fabbien Nahounou; Cliff Lighty; Young; Robert M. James; Grover Washington, Jr.	Muhammad; KayGee; Daniels; Paperboy Fabeeout	3:21
6.	"Hate Me"	Young; Rideout; Michael Ripoll	Ledisi; Rideout	4:01
7.	"Shut Up"	Michael Flowers; Young	Mike City	3:22
8.	"Shine"	Kelly; Webb; Young	Ledisi; Jon Jon Traxx	3:49
9.	"I Miss You Now"	John Stephens; Allen Arthur; Jessyca Wilson; Clayton Reilly; Keith Justice	Phatboiz	4:10
10.	"BGTY"	Young; Salaam Remi	Remi	3:31
11.	"Raise Up"	Young; Rideout	Ledisi; Rideout	4:04
12.	"I Gotta Get to You"	Young; Carvin Haggins; Christopher Barnes	Carvin & Ivan	4:50

iTunes edition bonus tracks
No.	Title	Writer(s)	Producer(s)	Length
13.	"One Step Ahead"	Charles Singleton; Edward Snyder	Singleton; Snyder	2:37

Deluxe edition bonus tracks
No.	Title	Writer(s)	Producer(s)	Length
13.	"Simple"	Young; Rideout	Rideout; Young	3:46
14.	"Turn Me Loose" (Unplugged)	Young; Rideout	Young	4:35

Notes

^{^[A]} denotes co-producer

Samples

- "Coffee" contains excerpts from "Black Frost" as written and performed by Grover Washington, Jr.

== Charts ==
=== Weekly charts ===
Chart (2011)	Peak position
US Billboard 200	8
US Indie Store Album Sales (Billboard)	23
US Top Album Sales (Billboard)	8
US Top Current Album Sales (Billboard)	8
US Top R&B/Hip-Hop Albums (Billboard)	2

=== Year-end charts ===
Chart (2011)	Position
US Top R&B/Hip-Hop Albums (Billboard)	48
Chart (2012)	Position
US Top R&B/Hip-Hop Albums (Billboard)	66
