= The Intimate Truth Tour =

2015 concert tour by Ledisi

- Tour by Ledisi
- Promotional poster for the tour
- Location: North America
- Associated album: The Intimate Truth
- Start date: February 27, 2015
- End date: March 29, 2015
- Legs: 1
- No. of shows: 23

Ledisi concert chronology
- The Truth Tour (2014); The Intimate Truth Tour (2015); Let Love Rule Tour (2018)

The Intimate Truth Tour was the fourth concert tour by American singer Ledisi to promote her live album The Intimate Truth (2015).

== Background and development ==
In December 2014, Essence and Rated R&B reported that Ledisi would be embarking on her The Intimate Truth Tour. Leela James and Raheem DeVaughn were announced as the tour's opening act. The tour began in Los Angeles at Club Nokio on February 27, 2015. During the tour, Ledisi battled bronchitis. In contrast with her live album The Intimate Truth, Ledisi performed several acoustic versions of her songs during the set list.

== Critical reception ==
Maura Johnston of The Boston Globe reviewed the March 19 concert. Johnston praised Ledisi's performance "Ledisi has been battling bronchitis for much of her current tour, but that fact was hardly apparent on Thursday; her voice is a marvel to behold, supercharging both her everyday observations and her late-night come-ons." Melissa Ruggieri of The Atlanta Journal-Constitution reviewed the final show of the tour in Atlanta. Ruggieri praised the acoustic segment of the concert stating "This tender moment felt like a live recording session, with Ledisi at her best authentic self – including playfully singing both the high and low parts of "Stay Together," a duet she sang on her "Pieces of Me" album with singer Jaheim. Of course, you knew it was going to be good, when she tuned up the band with her trademark freestyle scatting."

== Opening acts ==
- Raheem DeVaughn
- Leela James

== Set list ==
1. "Lose Control"
2. "Quick Fix"
3. "In the Morning"
4. "Take My Hand, Precious Lord"
5. "Hate Me"
6. "The Truth"
7. "88 Boxes"
8. "Like This"
9. "Rock with You"
10. "Stay Together"
11. "That Good Good"
12. "Alright"
13. "Pieces of Me"
14. "I Blame You"
15. "Bravo"

== Tour dates ==
List of concerts showing date, city, country, venue and opening acts
Date (2015)	City	Country	Venue
February 27	Los Angeles	United States	Club Nokia
February 28	Fresno	United States	Tower Theatre Fresno
March 1	Oakland	United States	Ox Theater
March 4	Houston	United States	Bayou Music Center
March 5	Dallas	United States	Majestic Theater
March 6	Tulsa	United States	The Brady
March 7	Memphis	United States	Orpheum Center
March 8	St. Louis	United States	The Pageant
March 11	Chicago	United States	Portage Theater
March 12	Cleveland	United States	House of Blues
March 13	Detroit	United States	Motor City Casino
March 14	Indianapolis	United States	Murat Theater
March 15	Baltimore	United States	Lyric Theatre
March 18	Bethlehem	United States	Sands Bethlehem Event Center
March 19	Boston	United States	Wilbur Theater
March 20	Newark	United States	NJPAC
March 21	Washington, D.C.	United States	DAR Constitution Hall
March 22	Richmond	United States	Altria Theater
March 25	Charlotte	United States	The Fillmore
March 26	Greensboro	United States	Cone Denim Entertainment Center
March 27	Nashville	United States	War Memorial Auditorium
March 28	Myrtle Beach	United States	House of Blues
March 29	Atlanta	United States	Symphony Hall
