= Let Love Rule (Ledisi album) =

Studio album by Ledisi
- Released: September 22, 2017
- Genre: R&B
- Length: 44:17
- Label: Verve
- Producers: Ivan Barias; Butta-N-Bizkit; Timothy Bullock; DJ Camper; Nelson Davis; Kirk Franklin; Jeff Gitelman; DJ Khalil; Ledisi

Ledisi chronology
The Intimate Truth (2015)	Let Love Rule (2017)	The Wild Card (2020)

Singles from Let Love Rule
- 1. "High" Released: May 12, 2017; 2. "Add to Me" Released: September 22, 2017; 3. "If You Don't Mind" Released: November 18, 2017; 4. "All the Way" Released: January 12, 2018

Let Love Rule is the eighth studio album by American musician Ledisi. It was released in September 2017 under Verve Records. The album was nominated for Best R&B Album at the 60th Grammy Awards in January 2018.

== Background ==
Following the release of her seventh album The Truth (2014), two concert tours: The Truth Tour (2014) and The Intimate Truth Tour (2015), and her portrayal of Mahalia Jackson in the historical drama film Selma (2014), Ledisi took a career hiatus in 2016. She returned to recording music at the request of her music collaborator and producer Rex Rideout.

== Recording and production ==
This project was harder for me because I wasn't ready to record. It's like going into a marathon and you're physically in there but your mental isn't there. That's how I was, trying to get into it. I just wasn't ready, but Rex was like, It's time.' When I started to work on it and met different producers and different people, I didn’t know who they were. I just walked into a room empty, blank, not really knowing what to do. I just became a follower and it opened a door for me to experience different writers and producers. I had a good time working with DJ Khalil, John Legend as a writer. Working with Rex [Rideout] was my favorite still because it was just basic piano and singing. It was us together just writing a song the old-fashioned way.

— Ledisi (Tidal Magazine interview)

Ledisi recorded the album in sessions at 17 Hertz Studio, DJ Khalil Studios, Unit 2 Studio, and Paramount Recording Studios in Los Angeles; Luminous Sound in Dallas, Texas; Uncle Jessie's Kitchen in Arlington, Texas; and IV Lab Studios in Chicago, Illinois. She collaborated with several record producers and songwriters, including John Legend, Sam Barsh, Daniel Seeff, Butta-N-BizKit, Charles Hinshaw Jr., Hue Strother, DJ Camper, Timothy Bullock, Nelson Davis, Coleridge Tillman, Ivan Barias, Jacquetta Singleton, Jeff Gitelman, Jairus Mozee, Bryan Sledge, and long-time collaborator Rex Rideout. She also collaborated with some musicians she had never worked with in the past, such as DJ Khalil on "Shot Down"; Kirk Franklin on "If You Don't Mind". Aside from spoken word interludes by Iyanla Vanzant and Soledad O'Brien as well as "If You Don't Mind" by Kirk Franklin, Ledisi either co-wrote or co-produced all material on Let Love Rule.

In July 2017, Ledisi told Billboard magazine that the album "This album was one of the hardest I've ever worked on. We were looking for songs that could stand the test of time. This wasn't a quickie; it was about great songwriting. I've come back to what I love about R&B and also what I love about today’s music." She recorded a mixture of songs and intermezzos inspired by 1970's soul to 21st century R&B.

== Release and promotion ==
On July 31, 2017, Ledisi revealed the title of the album and its release date to Billboard magazine. In August 2017, Ledisi performed "High" on the annual award show Black Girls Rock!. Let Love Rule was released on September 22, 2017. She later performed "High" on American syndicated talk show Harry on October 6, 2017. On November 21, 2017, Ledisi appeared on NPR Music's Tiny Desk to perform a brief set list of songs from the album; including "Let Love Rule", "Add to Me", and "High".

=== Singles ===
"High" was released as the first single on May 12, 2017. The song, a mixture of trap music and R&B, entered Billboard's Adult R&B Songs chart on June 17, 2017, and peaked at number seven. It spent a total of twenty-one weeks on the chart. On August 21, 2017, Ledisi released the music video for "High", directed by Noble Jones. "Add to Me" was released as the album's second single on September 22, 2017. The song peaked at number nineteen on the Adult R&B Songs chart. The music video was also directed by Ron T. Young.

"If You Don't Mind", which features gospel musician Kirk Franklin, was released as a radio-only single in late 2017. The song peaked number ten on Billboard's Hot Gospel Songs chart, number eleven on the Gospel Airplay chart, and number seventeen on the Gospel Digital Song Sales chart. On January 12, 2018, Ledisi released "All the Way" as the final single of the album. The song peaked number eight on the Adult R&B Songs chart.

=== Tour ===
On October 25, 2017, Ledisi embarked on The Rebel, The Soul & The Saint Tour alongside Kirk Franklin and PJ Morton. During the tour, Ledisi performed a R&B set list. The tour received positive reviews for its innovative way in "combining multi-genres on one bill could only be deemed risky by those not knowing that prior to the 1900s gospel music had influenced jazz and blues and after the 1900s jazz and blues were influencing gospel music."

In May 2018, she embarked on the Let Love Rule Tour to promote the album, with Melanie Fiona and Tweet opening for her. The tour featured seventeen dates and ended on June 19, 2018.

==== Tour dates ====
Date (2018)	City	Venue
North America
May 24	Raleigh	The Ritz
May 25	Charlotte	The Fillmore
May 26	Atlanta	Soul Life Music Festival
May 27	Orlando	House of Blues
May 29	Greensboro	Cone Denim Center
May 30	Greenville	Peace Center Concert Hall
June 1	Washington, D.C.	Capital Jazz Festival
June 2	Atlantic City	Borgata Resort & Spa
June 3	Montclair	Wellmont Theatre
June 4	Boston	Wilbur Theatre
June 6	Cincinnati	Taft Theatre
June 7	Detroit	MotorCity Casino
June 8	Cleveland	House of Blues
June 9	Hammond	Horseshoe Casino
June 10	Kansas City	Uptown Theatre
June 13	Nashville	Schermerhorn Symphony Center
June 14	Memphis	Minglewood Hall
June 15	Houston	House of Blues
June 17	Dallas	Majestic Theatre

== Critical reception ==
Professional ratings
Review scores
Source	Rating
AllMusic	4/5 stars
PopMatters	7/10

In his review for AllMusic, editor Andy Kellman wrote that Ledisi "continues to roll with Let Love Rule, an album rich with her characteristically positive and proud outlook and superhuman vocal skill. It's something of a milestone for Ledisi and long-term collaborator Rex Rideout, who have been recording together since 2007. The four songs they co-wrote are top of the line, showing they've only gained steam since then." Steve Horowitz of PopMatters praised the album for its themes "..about living for today, remembering tomorrow is a new start, that pain is essential to forgiveness, listening needed for understanding, and love is all that really matters."

=== Accolades ===
Let Love Rule received a nomination for Best R&B Album at the 60th Annual Grammy Awards in 2018. The song "High" received a nomination for Best R&B Performance while "All the Way" received a nomination for Best Traditional R&B Performance. The album also won Soul Train Certified Award in 2018.

== Commercial performance ==
In the United States, Let Love Rule debuted at number one-hundred on the Billboard 200, only remaining on that chart for one week. The album also spent one week on the Top R&B Albums chart.

== Track listing ==
No.	Title	Writer(s)	Producer(s)	Length
1.	"I Choose Today (Intro)" (featuring Iyanla Vanzant)	Ledisi Young	—	0:07
2.	"Shot Down"	Khalil Abdul-Rahman; Sam Barsh; Daniel Seeff; Young	DJ Khalil	3:13
3.	"Tomorrow Is a New Start (Interlude)" (featuring Soledad O'Brien)	Young	—	0:05
4.	"Let Love Rule"	Allen Arthur; Brittany Barber; Keith Justice; Young	Butta-N-Bizkit	4:00
5.	"Add to Me"	Darhyl Camper; Charles Hinshaw; Hue Strother; Young	DJ Camper	3:38
6.	"Hello to the Pain (Interlude)" (featuring Iyanla Vanzant)		—	0:05
7.	"Hello"	Timothy Bullock; Nelson Davis; Coleridge Tillman; Young	Bullock; Davis^{[A]}	2:44
8.	"Forgiveness"	Ivan Barias; Jacquetta Singleton; Young	Barias	4:51
9.	"Here"	Jeff Gitelman; Rex Rideout; Young	Gitelman	4:02
10.	"Us 4Ever" (featuring BJ the Chicago Kid)	Jairus Mozee; Rideout; Bryan Sledge; Young	Ledisi	4:29
11.	"Give You More" (featuring John Legend)	Arthur; Barber; Justice; John Stephens; Young	Butta-N-Bizkit	3:28
12.	"High"	Camper; Hinshaw; Rideout; Young	Camper	4:12
13.	"Understanding"/"I Love You (Interlude)" (featuring Soledad O'Brien)	Young	—	0:17
14.	"All the Way"	Rideout; Young	Ledisi	5:02
15.	"If You Don't Mind"	Kirk Franklin	Franklin	4:04

Notes

^{^[A]} denotes co-producer

== Charts ==
Chart	Peak position
US Billboard 200	100
US Top R&B Albums (Billboard)	12

== Release history ==
List of release dates, showing region, formats, label and reference
Region	Date	Format	Label	Ref.
Various	September 22, 2017	CD; digital download	Verve Records	
