= Lost & Found (Ledisi album) =

Studio album by Ledisi
- Released: August 28, 2007
- Studios: Backroom (Oakland, California); Coda (Oakland, California); First Avenue (Franklin, Tennessee); First Tribe Media (Long Beach, California); Glenwood Place (Burbank, California); The Greene Room (Van Nuys, California); KAR (Sherman Oaks, California); The Music Group (Sherman Oaks, California); Organboy (Hyattsville, Maryland); Riverphlo (Ontario, California); Spark (Emeryville, California); White Lightning (Sylmar, California)
- Genre: R&B
- Length: 59:53
- Label: Verve
- Producers: Ledisi; Sundra Manning; Rex Rideout; Jamey Jaz; Luther "Mano" Hanes; Lorenzo Johnson

Ledisi chronology
Feeling Orange but Sometimes Blue (2002)	Lost & Found (2007)	It's Christmas (2008)

Singles from Lost & Found
- 1. "Alright" Released: July 3, 2007; 2. "In the Morning" Released: March 18, 2008; 3. "Joy" Released: August 9, 2008

Lost & Found is the third studio album by American singer-songwriter Ledisi. It was released on August 28, 2007, by Verve Records.

Following a career hiatus which reignited her creativity, Ledisi was inspired to create a record with a basis in traditional rhythm and blues that stood apart from contemporary pop. Her collaborations with songwriters and record producers Rex Rideout, Lorenzo Johnson, Colin Stanbeck, and Luther "Mano" Hanes produced a mainstream R&B sound, developing diverse vocal styles and influences from funk, hip-hop, and soul music. Debuting on a major recording label, Ledisi eschewed the music of her previous releases in favor of an intimate, personal album. Lyrical themes of Lost & Found emphasize love, empowerment and relaxation, a result of Ledisi considering a maturer message to contend artistic credibility.

Lost & Found was promoted in late-2007 and throughout 2008 by television performances and festival appearances, such as Ledisi's performance at the Newport Jazz Festival in August 2008. The album received positive reviews by music critics; several publications included it on their year-end lists. It was her first album to debut on the US Billboard 200, and it also reached the top ten on the US Top R&B/Hip-Hop Albums. The album spawned three singles– "Alright", "In the Morning", and "Joy". At the 50th Annual Grammy Awards (2008), Lost & Found was nominated for Best R&B Album and Ledisi also earned a nomination for Best New Artist.

== Background ==
After the release of her second album Feeling Orange but Sometimes Blue in 2002, she reached a stagnation in her music career. She hoped to reached a wider audience after securing a distribution deal with Tommy Boy Records and reissuing her album Soulsinger in 2003. After experiencing financial problems and a divorce, Ledisi briefly contemplated suicide. She ultimately decided to quit the music industry and perform on Broadway. In 2006, Ledisi was invited to open a show for Chaka Khan in Washington DC. Ron Goldstein, who was the president of Verve Records, was in attendance of the show. After the show, Goldstein offered a recording contract to Ledisi.

== Recording and production ==
Ledisi had been recording her third album Lost & Found prior to her record deal. Most of the album was recorded at various recording studios in California. She worked with Rex Rideout, a music producer she worked with on the song "My Sensitivity (Gets In the Way)" for the Luther Vandross tribute album Forever, for Always, for Luther (2004). Ledisi also worked with songwriters and producers that she never worked with including Luther "Mano" Hanes, Lorenzo Johnson, Rick Watford, and Errol Cooney. She also worked with longtime collaborator and musician Sundra Manning. Ledisi stated that she was unsure of wanting to stay within the music industry. In response, she wrote the song "Alright" to express her life.

== Release and promotion ==
Lost & Found was released by Verve Records on August 28, 2007. To promote Lost & Found, Ledisi performed at several broadcast music festivals including the Essence Music Festival, Newport Jazz Festival, Montreux Jazz Festival, and Capital Jazz Festival. In 2007, she closed out an episode of Baisden After Dark by performing "Alright". On August 9, 2008, she re-appeared on the show and performed "In the Morning".

=== Singles ===
"Alright" was released as the lead single from Lost & Found on July 3, 2007. A moderate success, it peaked at number forty-five on the US Hot R&B/Hip-Hop Songs, selling over 45,000 copies in its first week. "Alright" also peaked at number eleven on the US Adult R&B Songs chart. The accompanying music video for "Alright", directed by Rashidi Harper and Maalik Armour, was the first music video released by Ledisi. The song was also featured on the soundtrack of comedy-drama film Meet the Browns.

"In the Morning" was released as the second single on March 18, 2008. An edited version of the song was released to radio stations. The song peaked at number forty-nine on the US Hot R&B/Hip-Hop Songs and number fifteen on the Adult R&B Songs chart, selling 23,000 copies in its first week. "Joy" was released to radio stations as the album's final single on August 9, 2008. The song peaked at number twenty-nine on the Adult R&B Songs chart.

== Critical response ==
Professional ratings
Review scores
Source	Rating
About.com	3/5 stars
AllMusic	4.5/5 stars
The Baltimore Sun	(favorable)
Billboard	(favorable)
Ebony	(favorable)
Montreal Mirror	(9/10)
Toronto Star	3/4 stars
USA Today	3/4 stars
Vibe	(favorable)
Washington Post	(favorable)

The album was rated 4.5 of 5 stars by AllMusic. AllMusic's Matthew Chisling praised the album's production and vocal performance. Chisling stated, "Lost & Found is a rare gem from 2007, a complex vocal masterpiece that shimmers and tantalizes with smooth beats, impressive songs, great mixes, and one incredible vocalist." Chisling further praised the album for not following a contemporary pattern of featuring rappers on the album. Chisling stated, "The album, even at 18 tracks long, never loses its focus; it doesn't rely on the hook of one song to convince the shopper to buy it. It doesn't play up to the R&B hype of its era with computers and guest rappers to entertain the minds of the listeners. It brings listeners back to a time when all you had to do was sing well to garner attention." Dan Quellette of Billboard highlighted several songs on the album and stated, "The CD opens and closes with Ledisi live on the funky "Been Here," between which she gets soulfully cool, upbeat grooving and ecstatically unrestrained. Highlights include the spanking-beat "Today," the smoothly lyrical "Get to Know You," the scat-charged "Upside Down" and the album's balladic gem, "Lost and Found (Find Me)."

=== Accolades ===
Award	Year	Category	Work	Result	Ref.
Grammy Awards	2008	Best New Artist	—	Nominated	
Grammy Awards	2008	Best R&B Album	Lost & Found	Nominated	

== Commercial performance ==
In the United States, Lost & Found debuted at number seventy-eight on the Billboard 200, with first-week sales of 8,900 copies. This marked her first album entry on the Billboard 200 album chart. The album spent twenty-two weeks on the chart before dropping off the Billboard chart. The album peaked at number ten on the US Top R&B/Hip-Hop Albums chart, spending a total of seventy-eight weeks on the chart. As of 2009, Lost & Found has sold over 237,000 copies in the United States.

== Track listing ==
All tracks are written by Ledisi Young and Rex Rideout, except as noted.

No.	Title	Writer(s)	Length
1.	"Been Here (Intro)"		1:44
2.	"Joy"		4:22
3.	"You and Me"		4:05
4.	"Best Friend"	Ledisi Young; Luther Hanes; Errol Cooney	4:39
5.	"Alright"		4:34
6.	"Think of You"		5:08
7.	"Today"	Young; Hanes	4:23
8.	"Get to Know You"	Young; Lorenzo Johnson	3:21
9.	"Upside Down"	Young; Sundra Manning	4:11
10.	"In the Morning"		4:48
11.	"I Tried"		4:05
12.	"Lost and Found (Find Me)" (featuring Karen Briggs)		3:13
13.	"We Are One" (featuring Rahsaan Patterson)		1:48
14.	"The One"	Young; Jamey Jaz; John Smith	4:02
15.	"Someday"	Young; Hanes; Rick Watford	4:18
16.	"Been Here (Outro)"		1:09

== Personnel ==
Adapted from the Lost & Found liner notes.

- Ledisi – vocals, drum programming (9)
- Rex Rideout – keyboards (1–3, 5, 6, 10–13, 16), programming (1–3, 5, 6, 10–13, 16)
- Kenneth "KC" Knight – organ (3)
- Luther "Mano" Hanes – keyboards (4, 7, 15), keyboard bass (4, 7, 15), drum programming (7)
- Lorenzo Johnson – instruments (8), drum programming (8)
- Sundra Manning – keyboards (9), clavinet (9), organ (9), drum programming (9)
- Jamey Jaz – instruments (14), drum programming (14)
- John "Jubu" Smith – guitars (1, 5, 9, 13, 14, 16)
- Errol Cooney – guitars (3, 4, 7, 11)
- Darrell Crooks – guitars (6, 10)
- Alvin White – guitars (8)
- Rick Watford – guitars (15)
- Melvin Davis – bass (1, 6, 10, 13, 16)
- Dwayne "Smitty" Smith – bass (3, 11)
- Maurice Fitzgerald – live bass (4, 7)
- Nelson Braxton – bass (9)
- Michael White – drums (1, 16), additional drums (10)
- LaDell Abrams – drums (4)
- John "Lil John" Roberts – drums (6, 13)
- Tommie Bradford – drums (9)
- Felix "D-Kat" Pollard – drums (15)
- Javier Solis – percussion (4)
- DJ Rocky Rock – scratching (6)
- Phillip Lassiter – horns (7), horn arrangements (7)
- Brandon Fields – saxophones (16)
- Nicholas Lane – trombone (16)
- Lee Thornburg – trumpet (16)
- Karen Briggs – violin (12)
- Rashaan Patterson – vocals (13)

=== Production ===
- Collin Stanback – executive producer, A&R direction
- Ledisi Young – executive producer, producer, A&R direction
- Dahlia Ambach-Caplin – A&R direction
- Rex Rideout – producer
- Luther "Mano" Hanes – producer
- Lorenzo Johnson – producer
- Sundra Manning – producer
- Jamey Jaz – producer
- Evelyn Morgan – A&R administrator
- Lisa Hansen – release coordinator
- Cameron Mizell – release coordinator
- John Newcott – release coordinator
- Cori Pillows – cover design
- Hollis King – package art direction
- Sachico Asano – package design
- Vincent Soyez – photography
- Cannon – styling
- Michelle Lewis – hair, make-up
- Peter Gargagliano – prop stylist
- CAS for Junes Sun – management

Technical credits

- Herb Powers, Jr – mastering at Powers House of Sound (New York City, New York)
- Ray Bardani – mixing at Glenwood Place Studios and Encore Studios (Burbank, California)
- John Jaszcz – mixing at The Bennett House (Franklin, Tennessee)
- Bob Powers – mixing at Shelter Island Sound (New York City, New York)
- Hector Delgado – recording
- Danny Duncan – recording
- Marc Greene – recording
- Jamey Jaz – recording
- Anthony Jeffries – recording
- Lorenzo Johnson – recording
- Sundra Manning – recording
- Rex Rideout – recording
- Carl Wheeler – recording
- Michael White – recording
- Ben Yonas – recording
- Grant Greene – assistant engineer

== Charts ==
=== Weekly charts ===
Weekly chart performance for Lost & Found
Chart (2007)	Peak position
US Billboard 200	78
US Top R&B/Hip-Hop Albums (Billboard)	10

=== Year-end charts ===
Year-end chart performance for Lost & Found
Chart (2008)	Position
US Top R&B/Hip-Hop Albums (Billboard)	47
