= Pieces of Me Tour =

2011–2012 concert tour by Ledisi

- Tour by Ledisi
- Promotional poster for the tour
- Location: North America
- Associated album: Pieces of Me
- Start date: October 10, 2011
- End date: January 27, 2012
- Legs: 1
- No. of shows: 28

Ledisi concert chronology
- Pieces of Me Tour (2011); B.G.T.Y. Tour (2012)

The Pieces of Me Tour was the debut concert tour by American singer-songwriter Ledisi. Although the tour was intended to showcase songs from her sixth studio album, Pieces of Me, (2011) the set list also featured songs from her previous albums.

== Background and development ==
I’ve been waiting to do something like this for years…but, honestly, I was afraid of headlining. To headline, there’s a pressure that comes with it. Expectations get higher and higher as the night goes on. You’re worried if people are going to hear their favorite songs or not. I’m a people pleaser, which is horrible. I really want my fans to be pleased. But I’m actually enjoying this. There’s a lot of work that comes with the show, before you go out and sing a song. But it’s rewarding to do your own show, too, so I’m all the way in it. I’m glad I’m doing it.

—Ledisi, Billboard magazine interview

Prior to the commencement of The Pieces of Me Tour in support of her sixth studio album Pieces of Me, Ledisi performed as the opening act of American singer Kem's Intimacy Tour. Fan-club tickets and VIP packages for the tour were made available for pre-order in August 2011 on Ticketmaster. The tour kicked off on October 10 at the North Carolina Theatre in Raleigh, North Carolina, with the first ending in North America. The second leg started at the Scala in London, England on January 20, 2012. The Pieces of Me Tour eventually visited twenty-eight in total.

Ledisi revealed that one of the hardest aspects of the show was working with lights as well as picking a longer set list of songs. In an interview with Baltimore Afro-American, she revealed that she had one month to pull the entire show together. She also implemented wardrobe changes throughout each concert.

== Concert synopsis ==
Timothy Bloom, who was also the tour's opening act, performed with Ledisi as her duet partner during the performance of "Stay Together". A highlight for many fans was her performance of "Pieces of Me". During the tour, Ledisi entered the crowd and gave the microphone to different fans to sing along with her.

== Critical reception ==
The Pieces of Me Tour received positive reviews from music critics. The Baltimore Afro-American's Alexis Taylor attended the concert in Baltimore at Lyric Opera House. Taylor wrote "Ledisi gave listeners every penny they paid for the show and then some. Leaving her all on the stage, Ledisi effectively re-baptized followers and converted unsuspecting first timers into faithful fans." Melody Charles of SoulTracks commented "Ledisi had turned the evening into ‘Love Thyself 101’".

== Opening acts ==
- Timothy Bloom
- Rahsaan Patterson

== Set list ==
1. "Raise Up"
2. "Higher Than This"
3. "I Tried"
4. "Coffee"
5. "Simple"
6. "Hate Me"
7. "Knockin'"
8. "Goin' Thru Changes"
9. "I Gotta Get to You"
10. "Stay Together"
11. "Bravo"
12. "Four Women"
13. "Pieces of Me"
14. "Alright"

== Tour dates ==
Date	City	Venue
North America
October 20, 2011	Raleigh	North Carolina Theatre
October 21, 2011	Washington, D.C.	Warner Theatre
October 22, 2011	Philadelphia	Temple Performing Arts Center
October 23, 2011	New York City	Apollo Theater
October 25, 2011	Charlotte	Knight Center
October 27, 2011	Jacksonville	Florida Theatre
October 28, 2011	Atlanta	Atlanta Symphony Hall
October 29, 2011	Memphis	Cannon Center for Performing Arts
November 1, 2011	Nashville	Cannery Ballroom
November 2, 2011	New Orleans	House of Blues
November 3, 2011	Houston	House of Blues
November 4, 2011	Dallas	Palladium Ballroom
November 10, 2011	Los Angeles	Club Nokia
November 12, 2011	Oakland	Fox Theatre
November 15, 2011	Minneapolis	Fine Line
November 17, 2011	Chicago	Park West
November 18, 2011	Detroit	Royal Oak Theatre
November 19, 2011	Indianapolis	Egyptian Room
November 20, 2011	Cleveland	House of Blues
November 22, 2011	Columbus	Lincoln Theatre
November 23, 2011	Baltimore	Lyric Opera House
Europe
January 20, 2012	London	Scala
January 21, 2012	Paris	La Maroquinerie
January 22, 2012	Brussels	Le Botanique
January 23, 2012	Amsterdam	Paradiso
January 25, 2012	Innsbruck	Treibhaus
January 26, 2012	Zurich	Kaufleuten
January 27, 2012	Vienna	Porgy and Bess
