= The Truth Tour =

2014 concert tour by Ledisi

- Tour by Ledisi
- Promotional poster for the tour
- Location: North America
- Associated album: The Truth
- Start date: April 16, 2014
- End date: May 15, 2014
- Legs: 1
- No. of shows: 29

Ledisi concert chronology
- B.G.T.Y. Tour (2012); The Truth Tour (2014); The Intimate Truth Tour (2015)

The Truth Tour was the third concert tour by American singer Ledisi, in support of her seventh album The Truth (2014).

== Background ==
In February 2014, Ledisi announced that tickets for The Truth Tour were on sale. The tour was sponsored by Essence and visited thirty venues during its North American run. As part of the media partnership, every ticket purchase came with a free download of The Truth which would be redeemable on the album's release (March 11, 2014), as well as a one-year subscription to Essence magazine. The concert tour began at Florida Theatre in Jacksonville, Florida on April 16, 2014.

== Development ==
As with her previous tours, Ledisi had multiple outfits throughout the show. Her wardrobes were designed by Alexander McQueen. In preparation for the tour, Ledisi also added choreography to show. She took a Hip Hop in Heels class with Brandee Evans, where she practiced choreography and danced in six to seven inch heels. She also added background dancers Brandee Evans and Christina Webber.

BJ Pendleton, who had work with Robert Glasper Experiment, was the tour's front-of-house engineer and production manager. Rick Wright, who worked as an engineer on the Pieces of Me Tour, was hired as the monitor engineer. Pendleton used Shure microphones for Ledisi and the background singers.

== Critical reception ==
Samantha Hunter of VH1 reviewed the concert at the Beacon Theatre in New York City on April 30, 2014. Hunter wrote, "The show was elevated and transformed from not just an entertaining concert (well worth the price of admission), but a platform for sharing, connecting and teaching. SoulTracks' Melody Charles attended the concert in Dallas at the Majestic Theatre. Charles noted the choreography stating "Ledisi's always been a mover and shaker, but the hair-whipping and precision choreography she displayed during "Rock With You" practically put her in Janet Jackson-type territory."

== Opening act ==
- Robert Glasper Experiment

== Set list ==
1. "That Good Good"
2. "Bravo"
3. "Rock with You"
4. "Higher Than This"
5. "Goin' Thru Changes"
6. "Stay Together"
7. "Like This"
8. "Lose Control"
9. "In the Morning"
10. "Anything"
11. "The Truth"
12. "Gonna Be Alright (F.T.B.)"
13. "Pieces of Me"
14. "Alright"
15. "I Blame You"

== Tour dates ==
Date (2014)	City	Venue
North America
April 16	Jacksonville	Florida Theatre
April 17	Mobile	Saenger Theatre
April 18	Memphis	Orpheum Theater
April 19	Indianapolis	Murat Theater
April 22	Toledo	Stranahan Theater
April 24	Detroit	Detroit Opera House
April 25	Chicago	Chicago Theatre
April 26	Louisville	Palace Theatre
April 27	Cleveland	House of Blues
April 28	Toronto	Danforth Music Hall
April 30	New York City	The Beacon Theatre
May 1	Philadelphia	Tower Theatre
May 2	Norfolk	Chrysler Hall
May 3	Washington, D.C.	Dar Constitution Hall
May 4	Baltimore	Pier 6 Pavilion
May 6	Durham	Durham PAC
May 8	Charlotte	The Fillmore
May 9	Atlanta	Chastain Park Amphitheatre
May 10	St. Louis	The Pageant
May 11	Nashville	War Memorial Auditorium
May 13	Kansas City	Midland
May 14	Dallas	Majestic Theatre
May 16	Houston	Bayou Music Center
May 17	Austin	ACL Live
May 21	San Francisco	Warfield Theatre
May 22	Los Angeles	Club Nokia
May 23	Las Vegas	House of Blues
May 24	San Diego	San Diego Jazz Festival
May 25	Sacramento	Woodlake Inn

== Personnel ==
Band

- Musical director/Guitarist: Chuck Gibson
- Bass: Idris Davis
- Keyboard: Tony Walker, Mike Moore
- Drums: James Agnew
- Backup vocalists: Danetra Moore, Sara Williams

Dancers

- Backup dancers: Brandee Evans, Christina Webber
