= List of The Donna Reed Show episodes =

The Donna Reed Show is an American sitcom starring Donna Reed as the middle-class housewife Donna Stone. Carl Betz co-stars as her pediatrician husband Dr. Alex Stone, and Shelley Fabares and Paul Petersen as their teenage children, Mary and Jeff. 275 half-hour episodes were made, all in black-and-white. The show originally aired on ABC from September 24, 1958, to March 19, 1966.

== Series overview ==
Season	Episodes	Originally released	
Season	Episodes	First released	Last released
1	37	September 24, 1958	June 3, 1959
2	38	September 24, 1959	June 16, 1960
3	38	September 15, 1960	June 8, 1961
4	39	September 14, 1961	June 14, 1962
5	34	September 20, 1962	May 9, 1963
6	32	September 19, 1963	April 23, 1964
7	30	September 17, 1964	April 8, 1965
8	27	September 16, 1965	March 19, 1966

== Episodes ==
=== Season 1 (1958–59) ===
No. overall	No. in season	Title	Directed by	Written by	Original release date
1	1	"Weekend Trip"	Andrew McCullough	Phil Leslie	September 24, 1958
At breakfast, Donna agrees that the kids are not seeing enough of father Alex. At that moment, Dr. Alex is in his office with little Eddie Barclay, who claims he does not feel well. Alex cannot find anything wrong with the boy. Donna would like to arrange a skiing weekend for the family. Donna cannot understand why their obstetrician friend Dr. Boland (Jackie Kelk) can get off, but not Alex. Donna asks Boland if he could cover for Alex for the weekend and he says he can. Alex says he cannot go because he is to be a witness in a court case for banker George Heiser (Howard Wendell). Donna finds a way to get George to drop his case. Alex forgot to tell Donna she was to host a luncheon this weekend. Donna's friend Marge says she can host it instead. It is Friday morning and the family gets ready to leave that afternoon. Mrs. Barclay (Alice Reinheart) calls about Eddie. Something Donna tells Eddie makes him suddenly feel great. Jeff's sudden case of chicken pox puts the trip on hold.
2	2	"Pardon My Gloves"	Oscar Rudolph	Alan Lipscott & Bob Fisher	October 1, 1958
Donna has a role in an amateur stage production. She is not getting along so well with Lydia Langley, the director. Lydia really wanted to play Donna's part. Jeff comes home with a black eye, but will not say who he was fighting with. Later, Jeff shows Alex a second black eye and is about to tell him who it was. Donna comes by complaining about Lydia and says she quit the play. Jeff will not tell Donna who he is fighting with. Mary tells Alex and Donna that she saw Jeff fighting with Chunky, Lydia's son. Donna goes to speak with Lydia and Chunky. Chunky says that Jeff started the fight because Chunky said that Donna could not act. Chunky was just repeating what his Mother had said. Donna tells Lydia that she is returning to the part. Donna tells Jeff that she knows why the fights started. Jeff says that he will still have to fight Chunky if he says Donna cannot act again. Donna, then Alex, try to teach Jeff how to fight. It is the night of the play and Jeff tells Donna that he beat up Chunky. Alex comes home with a black eye. He tried to give first aid to Chunky and Chunky hit him.
3	3	"The Hike"	Oscar Rudolph	Jay Sommers & Don Nelson	October 8, 1958
Jeff is looking forward to going on an overnight camping trip with some friends and Alex. A medical emergency forces Alex to pull out of the trip. Donna volunteers to take over and Alex reluctantly agrees. Jeff, however, is not thrilled. Alex gives Donna some tips on what to do on the trip. Once out in the wild, Donna is not having an easy go of it. Forest Ranger Ferguson offers Donna his help if she needs anything. When the boys come back from fishing, the camp is all set up, there is wood chopped and there is a stew cooking. The boys are impressed. That night, Donna reads the boys a scary story. The next day, Jeff tells Alex what a great time they had. Alex tells Donna that he knows about Ranger Ferguson because he called the ranger station and had them check on her. Donna says that Ferguson did not help her. Donna overhears Alex call Ferguson, who confirms he did not help Donna. Alex apologizes for doubting her. But then something happens and Alex finds out how Donna pulled it all off.
4	4	"Male Ego"	Oscar Rudolph	Nate Monaster	October 15, 1958
Mary gives a speech on motherhood during a "Freshman Class Essay Contest" that has everyone praising Donna. Alex is annoyed and starts to feel under-appreciated. Donna and Alex go to buy him a new suit. Despite Alex's opinion, the salesman asks Donna her preference. Alex's friend Dr. Winfield Graham (Lawrence Dobkin) mentions to Alex and Donna that the whole maternity ward is talking about Mary's speech. Reporter Hank Cole (Alvy Moore), of the Daily Sentinel, comes by the Stone house and wants to do a story about Donna. Hank takes pictures of Donna and the children and leaves Alex out. Donna turns Alex's birthday party into an homage to father Stone. Everyone gives a little speech honoring Alex, including Dr. Graham. Donna gives a very touching speech. Alex gets a phone call and has to rush out to make a house call. Alex feels really good when the family is there to greet him when he returns. Sid Tomack as Mac.
5	5	"The Football Uniform"	Oscar Rudolph	William Cowley & Peggy Chantler	October 22, 1958
Donna and Mary organize items the Stone family plan to donate to a charity auction. When Jeff donates a toy rocket that Donna has recently bought him, Donna and Alex agree to stop spoiling the boy. Jeff and some local boys are very into playing football. Jeff now has his heart set on getting a football uniform. Alex and Donna tell him he must save his money to pay for it. Jeff's friend Eddie Barclay comes by wearing a new uniform. He says that the boys' football team will be photographed for the local newspaper in three days. Jeff is disappointed because he will not have enough money by then. Donna tells Alex about the boys being photographed, but he still will not buy Jeff a uniform. Donna arranges for someone to donate a uniform. It is the night of the auction and Jeff is bidding on the uniform with the money he has. Donna and Alex each bid on it not knowing the other is bidding. After Donna finally wins the uniform, they realize they were bidding against each other. Suzanne Storrs as Mrs. Cooper.
6	6	"The Foundling"	Oscar Rudolph	John Whedon	October 29, 1958
At the breakfast table, Donna reminds her family that Kathleen (Fintan Meyler), an Irish woman with no boyfriends, will be coming to clean the house today. Mary goes to see if Tony the milkman (Paul Picerni) has arrived. She finds an abandoned baby boy in a basket, left on the Stones' doorstep. Kathleen finds a note asking Donna to take care of the baby, whose name is Willie. Alex, who thinks the baby should be turned over to the authorities, fears the family is becoming too attached to it. Tony arrives, sees the baby, and says he will leave some special milk for it. A policeman comes by to pick up the baby. Alex has a change of heart and wants to keep the baby until the mother is found. Donna decides to play baby detective. She finds out the baby belongs to Tony. His wife has passed away and he hoped Donna could take care of Willie, because he knows Donna has a good home. Donna agrees to keep the baby until something can be worked out. Donna tries a little matchmaking between Tony and Kathleen.
7	7	"Three Part Mother"	Oscar Rudolph	Nate Monaster	November 5, 1958
At the breakfast table, Alex is going over a speech he is to give at the annual meeting of the medical society that evening. Donna intends to be there, but Jeff asks if she will be at his basketball game. Jeff learns that he will be in the starting line-up for the first time. Donna calls Alex to see if he would mind if she went to Jeff's game, which Alex agrees to. Family friend Woody Graham (Ross Elliott) comes by. He tells Donna that because they are new to the small town of Hilldale, it is important that she be at Alex's meeting. Mary tells Donna that she has been invited to join a special girl's club and the other mothers want to meet Donna at the initiation that evening. Donna is frustrated because she does not know what she is going to do. Alex, Mary and Jeff each feel bad and say they understand if she cannot make it to their events. With a lot of running around, Donna manages to spend some time with each family member. Note: Although aired later, this episode seems to introduce the series.
8	8	"Change Partners and Dance"	James V. Kern	William Roberts	November 12, 1958
Mary wants to go to the "Varsity Prom" with handsome George Haskell (Jimmy Hawkins), the basketball star who works in the school library. George does not seem to notice Mary and she feels unattractive. Mary finds a way to get George to carry some library books home for her. Donna proceeds to flatter George. When George says he does not know how to dance, Donna has Mary show him. After George steps on Mary's foot, Donna dances with him. George does ask Mary to the dance. George comes over the next few days for more dance lessons and seems to be more interested in Donna. Mary gets upset when George brings Donna a box of candy and she tells George she is not going to the dance. Donna gets George to come by the house. Donna makes herself very unattractive and finds a way to get George more interested in Mary. George and Mary go to the dance.
9	9	"Dough Re-Mi"	Oscar Rudolph	Alan Lipscott & Bob Fisher	November 19, 1958
Donna needs to raise money for the hospital committee. Jeff mentions to Donna and Alex that he needs $33 so his "Bobcats" football team can buy a new tackling dummy. Donna would like to get concert pianist Anton Duval (Roger Til) for a charity benefit. Antoinette is a new girl at school and she has a crush on Jeff. She comes by Jeff's house and asks him to come to her house for a dinner party. Donna is having a hard finding a way to be introduced to Duval. It turns out that Antoinette is Duval's daughter and he comes by to pick her up. He starts playing some Rock 'n' Roll on the piano. Donna, who is on the phone, thinks it is Mary playing and yells from the kitchen to stop. Later, Jeff tells Donna it was Duval playing. Lydia Langley tells Donna she ran into Duval and he turned down the idea of playing the benefit. Lydia would rather put on her play to raise the money. To help Donna with Duval, Jeff agrees to have dinner with Antoinette. Jeff brings Duval and Antoinette home with him. Duval says that, despite he is in town for a rest, he will play the benefit as long as the Bobcats get their tackling dummy.
10	10	"Guest in the House"	Oscar Rudolph	John Whedon	November 26, 1958
Mary tells Donna there is a policeman at the door. He is there with a 7-year-old runaway who will not say where he belongs and was standing outside the house. Alex calls the house and Donna learns the boys name is David Barker (Charles Herbert). Turns out, he ran away from the hospital where Alex was tending to him. Alex comes home and says he is sending incorrigible David back to military school. Donna would like to keep David for Thanksgiving break and Alex gets the OK from the school. Donna and Alex find a letter from David's father, Major R. H. Barker (John Bryant), and it is not very nice. It is Thanksgiving day and Donna is talking with David. She finds out that David's mother left him and his father. He also does not think his father loves him. The family is about to have turkey dinner when Major Barker comes to the door. Something Donna does and says brings David and his father back together.
11	11	"The Baby Contest"	Oscar Rudolph	William Cowley & Peggy Chantler	December 3, 1958
Helen Cooper (Anne Whitfield) has brought her baby to see Alex and she brags about the wonderful things the baby can do. Donna's Women's Club votes to have a baby beauty contest at the community picnic. Donna learns that Margaret Lang (Virginia Christine) is ashamed of her "homely" baby. Everyone but Donna wants pediatrician Alex to be the judge. Before Donna has a chance to tell Alex, Jeffs tells him a friend told him Alex is to be the judge. Alex believes that he will be run out of town because all the losing mothers will be mad at him. Many of the mothers are now doing special things for Alex. Margaret brings her baby Jimmy for a check up. Margaret does not want to enter Jimmy in the contest, but Donna talks her into it. It is the day of the contest and Alex is looking over all the babies. Alex awards the trophy to Margaret's little Jimmy. The other mothers are actually happy for Margaret. Later, Donna tells Alex the mothers want to make the baby contest a yearly event. Ruth Terry as Ruth Sterling. Dorothy Morris as Shirley Watson.
12	12	"The Beaded Bag"	Oscar Rudolph	Nate Monaster	December 10, 1958
It will soon be Donna's birthday and she has been admiring a beaded hand bag at the department store. But she feels it is too expensive. Jeff wants to borrow some money from Mary to buy Donna a gift. She refuses at first, but then makes a deal with him. Alex does not know what to get Donna as she always says there is nothing she wants as a present. Donna's friend Patsy Cole (Angela Greene) informs Alex that Donna has been eyeing the hand bag. So, he thinks Donna is using a feminine trick to get him to buy her the bag. Alex goes to see Miss Winters (Mary Treen), the department store clerk, who tells him the hand bag would be a perfect gift. It is the morning of Donna's birthday and the children give her their presents. Alex gives Donna the bag and implies that her feminine trick worked. Donna, upset by this, returns the bag. Donna finds out that Patsy told Alex about the bag. Something Mary says makes Donna want the bag back. Rickie Sorensen as Bobby Cole.
13	13	"The Busy Body"	Oscar Rudolph	Teleplay by Henry Sharp, Kay Lenard and Jess Carneol; Story by Kay Lenard & Jess Carneol	December 17, 1958
Donna's Uncle, Fred Sutton (Rhys Williams), swoops in for an unexpected visit. Alex is not thrilled. The kids are impressed by his stories of his recent trip to Africa. The next day, Alex gets annoyed with Fred tying up the phone so much and his know everything attitude. Fred causes a rift between Mary and her boyfriend Mike. Jeff is upset that the playground is closed. Fred tells Mayor Webster (Irving Bacon) off on the phone. He insults Mrs. Adams (Ann Doran), the mother of Timmy, one of Alex's patients. Though he means well, Donna tries to tell Fred that he cannot treat people that way. Donna tries to smooth things over with the people Fred talked to. But in a twist, these people actually wind up appreciating what Uncle Fred said and did. Fred says his business call came through and he would be leaving. Donna talks him into staying for a final dinner. Fred says he will cook an exotic African meal.
14	14	"A Very Merry Christmas"	Oscar Rudolph	Nate Monaster	December 24, 1958
Donna is frantically making last-minute preparations for Christmas. She is also disappointed when no one seems to care for the fruitcakes she is giving for Christmas presents. Donna believes people have lost the Christmas spirit. When she goes to get a present for the Head Nurse, the department store is a madhouse. Donna visits some of the children who cannot leave their ward and return home for the holiday. She notices that there is no Christmas tree. Donna also cannot seem to find out who plans the Christmas party for the children. Donna finally learns that Charlie (Buster Keaton), the hospital handyman, is usually in charge of the party. But, this year there is no one to help him. Donna helps Charlie throw the children a special party. She even gets Charlie to play Santa. Alex, Jeff and Mary show up with more presents. Donna gives Charlie a present. Murray Alper as Joe. Mary Adams as Nurse.
15	15	"Mary's Double Date"	Oscar Rudolph	Alan Lipscott & Bob Fisher	December 31, 1958
Mary has two potential dates to the Junior Prom. She cannot decide if she should go with left tackle Ernie (Bobby Burgess), or right tackle Phil. Mary prefers Ernie, but must string Phil along while waiting to see if Ernie will break up with his girlfriend Angela. Another classmate, Charlie, fawns over Mary. But, Mary is not romantically interested in him. Donna tries to give Charlie advice on how to act towards Mary. Ernie does ask Mary, but when Phil calls, a confused Donna says Mary will go with him. The boys find out and both of them cancel on Mary. Mary decides to go with Charlie, but she cannot get a hold of him. Donna tells Mary that she needs to stop taking advantage of Charlie. A firmer and more confident Charlie comes to the house and takes Mary to the Prom.
16	16	"Jeff's Double Life"	Oscar Rudolph	Bill Manhoff	January 7, 1959
Donna and Alex return home late from a dinner party. Neighbor Celia Wilgus (Kathleen Freeman) comes by. She says she almost called the police, due to a noisy party at the Stone's house. Mary confesses that she had some friends over including a trumpet player and a bongo drummer. Alex and Donna tell Mary and Jeff that "People expect a doctor and his family to set an example". The next day, Donna is worried when Jeff does not show up for lunch. Later, Jeff tells Mary that he accepted a ride from one of her friends, Tommy Hendricks. He does not have a license and took his father's car without permission. Tommy went through a traffic signal and the police started chasing him. Tommy ran into a tree and the two ran away. Jeff injured his arm in the process and is afraid to see Alex for treatment. Posing as "John Smith", Jeff goes to Dr. Barry (Peter Adams), another pediatrician who is new in town. Dr. Barry figures out who Jeff really is and calls Alex. Donna sees Jeff coming out of Dr. Barry's house and Jeff confesses what happened to him. Donna tells Alex what happened to Jeff. Alex talks to Jeff and they straighten things out. Alex and Donna also have a few words for Celia.
17	17	"Nothing But the Truth"	Oscar Rudolph	John Whedon	January 14, 1959
David Barker, who had previously spent Thanksgiving with the Stones, decides he would like to visit them again. He calls Donna and says that it is his birthday even though it is actually not for three weeks. David manages to get Donna to agree to have a party for him. Donna tells Alex that neighbor Mrs. Wilgus saw Jeff shooting his air rifle at her window. They confront Jeff about it and he says he was shooting at other things. After Jeff gets in trouble for lying, young David hears Mary say, "People who tell lies don't go to Heaven." That night David confesses his lie to Jeff, and he really feels bad about it. Jeff tells David to not say anything and maybe no one will find out. The next morning, the family gives David some birthday presents. Donna wonders why David is acting so strangely. David tells Donna it is not his birthday. She says it is OK and they will have a party anyway. Alex, Jeff and David go to get David's friend Mousie Myers. They wind up coming back with a car load of boys from the school and everyone has a great time. Mrs. Wilgus would like Alex and Donna to come over that night to play cards. Jeff and David catch them lying to Mrs. Wilgus about why they cannot make it.
18	18	"It is the Principle of the Thing"	Oscar Rudolph	Jerry Davis & Tom August	January 21, 1959
Mr. Popkin (Hans Conried) does not have the money to pay for his son Joey's (Robert L. Crawford Jr.) expensive treatment and he will not allow Alex to do it for free. Donna figures she can hire him for household chores, but he is a very difficult man to work with. Popkin's repairs wind up with disastrous results and Alex wants him to stop. When Donna goes to apologize to Popkin, she learns he has a talent for making toy rabbits. Donna wants Alex's help to try and get them displayed in Mr. Johnson's (Richard Deacon) toy store. Meanwhile, Jeff and shill Mary try to sell Popkin's toy rabbits on the street. A policeman comes by and tells them what they are doing is against the law. The cop takes them to the police station. Popkin saw what happened and calls Alex. Donna gets Mr. Johnson to agree to put the rabbits in his store window. Popkin does not like the way they are displayed and causes some problems. In the end, Popkin's toy rabbits prove to be quite popular and Mr. Johnson makes a deal with Popkin. When Popkin shows Donna another of his inventions, things do not go well.
19	19	"Jeff vs. Mary"	Oscar Rudolph	Story by : Alan Lipscott & Bob Fisher; Teleplay by : Henry Sharp & Alan Lipscott & Bob Fisher	January 28, 1959
The Stone's have an intercom system installed in the house. Dr. Boland comes by after returning from a trip to France. Donna suggests a homecoming party this Friday night. Jeff and Mary have a fight and Alex takes Mary's side. Jeff thinks his parents do not love him as much as they do Mary. Jeff's friend Zack tells him it is "The Law of Vanishing Returns" or, how a second child is not as loved as the first born. When Dr. Boland comes by for the party, Mary is allowed to stay up late, and entertain with her piano playing. Neither Donna nor Alex seem interested in watching Jeff performing his new magic act. Jeff sneaks out of the house to meet up with Zack. When he returns, he is caught by his parents. The next morning, Jeff will not say what is wrong. He tells Dr. Boland how he feels. Borland tells Alex and Donna. To prove they love their son as much as their daughter, Donna plans to have Jeff overhear a conversation she and Alex have on the intercom system. Except it is Zack that hears it and he sets Jeff straight.
20	20	"Have Fun"	Oscar Rudolph	John Whedon	February 4, 1959
Mary is anxious about a first date with Herbie Shields (George Hamilton), a boy two classes ahead of her. It is supposed to be a double date with a girlfriend of hers, Babs. Babs calls and cancels because she is sick. Mary now has to go out with Herbie alone. Herbie arrives and seems to be just as nervous. Mary comes home in tears because she thinks the date was a disaster. Donna tells Mary about her own first date with Alex on a New Year's Eve. Donna says it was a disaster as well and she did everything wrong. Among other things, she borrowed a dress that was too big and Alex kept leaving the table to make phone calls. Later, Alex tells Mary his version of the date in which he believes he did everything wrong and he did not have enough money for the date. Herbie comes by to return Mary's handkerchief. They realize things were awkward for both of them and it was no one's fault. Sherwood Price as Dr. Hooper.
21	21	"Donna Plays Cupid"	Oscar Rudolph	Story by : Alan Lipscott & Bob Fisher; Teleplay by : Henry Sharp & Alan Lipscott & Bob Fisher	February 11, 1959
Dr. Burt "Bo" Boland hurt his back carrying a redhead, who fainted, off the golf course. His friend Connie (Joanna Lee) thinks there is more to it. Donna and Alex bring Bo something to eat. Donna decides that bachelor Bo needs a woman. Mary hears her parents talking about Bo and thinks Donna's friend Ceil Pennington would be perfect for Bo. Ceil just broke up with her boyfriend Herbie Armbruster (Hal Baylor). Donna invites Bo and Ceil over for dinner. While at dinner, Bo and Ceil are uncomfortable, but get along. Then Herbie shows up. Herbie came by to ask Donna's help in reconciling with Ceil. But, when he sees Ceil and Bo together, he demands that Ceil marry him. Of course, that is exactly what Ceil wanted. Bo calls up Connie and tells her he is coming to pick her up. Later that evening, Donna thinks of someone else to set Bo up with.
22	22	"Love Thy Neighbor"	Oscar Rudolph	Nate Monaster	February 18, 1959
Alex & Donna are going to the Wilgus home to help them celebrate their 20th wedding anniversary. Celia and Wilbur Wilgus (Howard McNear) have been arguing over Wilbur's secretary, Miss Loretta Sanders (Maudie Prickett). Celia thinks he pays too much attention to her. Wilbur inadvertently mentions Loretta several times during the evening. Celia is stunned when Wilbur gives her a meat slicer as an anniversary gift. Celia leaves Wilbur after the party and arrives at Donna's door crying. She would like Donna to talk with Loretta. Donna lunches with Wilbur to try and find out if he is interested in Miss Sanders. But, Donna winds up giving Wilbur the impression that she is interested in him. Wilbur goes to talk to Alex and Alex has a big laugh over the misunderstanding. Celia and Wilbur make up and Alex has a little fun with Donna.
23	23	"The Report Card"	Oscar Rudolph	Nate Monaster	February 25, 1959
Donna is upset when Jeff brings home a less than stellar report card. Jeff is not worried about it. Mrs. Margaret Adams (Ann Doran) and her son Phil come by to see Alex. Margaret mentions to Donna that Phil is a "straight A" student. The family goes to the school's "Open House". Jeff's teacher, Miss Standish (Irene Vernon), tells Donna and Alex he is a smart boy, but is not very interested in learning. Donna tells Jeff that until his grades improve, he cannot do after school things with his friends. When Jeff befriends Phil Adams, Donna thinks he is only interested in copying the smarter boy's homework. But Donna soon learns that the other boys do not want Phil around because he is so smart. Jeff makes the boys take Phil in their group and give him a chance. Later, Jeff agrees to study more and get a few better grades.
24	24	"Boys Will Be Boys"	Oscar Rudolph	John Whedon	March 4, 1959
Major Ryan (Carleton Young), from the military school, would like to bring young David Barker to Dr. Stone because of a dog bite. What Ryan does not know, and David is hiding from him, is that David was actually bitten by one of the other boys. If David takes a shot, Alex will agree to let him stay over night and take the boys to a ball game the next day. Mary has a date and Donna and Alex are going to a friends house, so Jeff and David are left alone that night. The boys stay up late eating cake they were not supposed to and watching a gangster show. Alex and Donna come home and know the boys stayed up. Later, in his sleep, suffering from a guilty conscience, Dave has a dream that re-enacts the gangster program with Donna, Alex and himself as the characters. The next morning Jeff confesses to his parents. To protect Jeff, David lies and says it was all his fault and he made Jeff stay up late. Alex decides to still take the boys to the ball game. John Harmon and Ric Roman as characters in the gangster show.
25	25	"The Ideal Wife"	Oscar Rudolph	Nate Monaster	March 11, 1959
Donna and Alex are having a dinner party for two of his doctor friends and their wives. Dr. Harry Marcy (Don C. Harvey) and Ellen Marcy (Frances Robinson). Dr. Lester Brock and his wife Kate. Alex has to leave to make a house call. Everyone comments on how sweet and understanding Donna is. Donna comes to the conclusion that she is too nice for her own good. Donna regrets letting the children talk her out of making them do their chores. Alex then talks Donna out of going to a play she really wanted to see. Dry Cleaning man Mac (Sid Tomack) forgets to bring one of Donna's dresses. Fed up, Donna decides to change her sunny disposition, and orders him to go get it. Donna starts barking orders at her children. She makes Alex agree to go to the play. It does not take long for her to find out she is not happy with the "new" Donna.
26	26	"Mary's Campaign"	Oscar Rudolph	Nate Monaster	March 18, 1959
Mary is running to be the vice-president of her class and she wants to make sure her family does not do anything to ruin her chances. Mary says that her friend Cathy Robinson (Gigi Perreau) is her campaign manager. Mary will be running against Betsy Cartwright, who is an honor student, but not very popular. Donna is not happy that Cathy's campaign strategy is to emphasize Mary's good looks. Donna runs into Betsy. Betsy does not think she has a chance to win because all the boys will probably vote for Mary. Donna tells Alex that she hopes Mary loses because she has changed her looks and personality. Donna tells Mary it is better to be yourself, but Mary will have to choose. Mary is to give a speech and Cathy suggests making a lot of promises to the kids. Donna asks Vice Principal Miss Aldridge (Natalie Masters) if it would be OK to listen to the speeches. When Mary gives her speech, she is dressed plain and her hair is down. And while Mary is sad she lost, she is glad she did not win if it meant being someone she is not.
27	27	"The Flowered Print Dress"	Oscar Rudolph	Nate Monaster	March 25, 1959
Donna and Alex go to newlywed couple Jim and Carol Berke's (Olive Sturgess) house for dinner. When they get home, Donna asks Alex if they are in a rut. She wonders if they are taking each other for granted. Donna gets upset when Alex cannot tell her what dress she wore this evening. Alex mentions that he really liked her "flowered print" dress, but Donna cannot recall what dress that was. The next morning, Donna asks Alex about the flowered dress again. Donna shows Alex a daring new dress she wants to wear hoping he will remember it. Donna wants Alex to admit they are in a rut. Donna fantasizes about wearing several different daring dresses and Alex not liking any of them. Alex and Donna go to dinner with older couple Dr. Martin Butler (Addison Richards) and his wife Hilda (Lillian Bronson). Things begin to fall into place for Donna. When they get home, Donna remembers the flower print dress and finds it in the attic. It was the dress she wore when Alex proposed. They start fighting and Donna could not be happier.
28	28	"April Fool"	Oscar Rudolph	Jerry Davis & Tom August	April 1, 1959
Buzz Berry (James Darren), Mary's favorite rock singer, is coming to town for a show. Mary asks Alex if he could ask his friend Phil Martin (Ted Knight), manager of the Civic Auditorium, if he could get them some tickets. On the night of the show, Buzz comes down with the measles, and is taken to the Stones' house to be treated by Alex. Manager Lou Vance (Jesse White) begs Alex to let Buzz hide from fans at the Stone's home. Alex says no. Jeff tells Vance that he should talk to Donna. Mary faints when she learns Buzz is staying at the house. When Mary lets the word leak out that he is staying there, the house is besieged by his adoring fans. Mary tells them it was an April Fool's joke. All the girl's are now mad at Mary. Donna begins to regret she allowed Buzz to stay at the house. Buzz apologizes to Donna for Vance being so pushy. Buzz and Donna have a nice conversation. Buzz would like to make things right with Mary's friends, but he has to leave to catch a plane. Mary goes to a dance that night. Buzz shows up and dances with Mary. Doreen Tracey as Flo. Melinda Plowman as Sue. Note: "There's No Such Thing" (the record Mary plays) was Darren's first Colpix single.
29	29	"The Parting of the Ways"	Oscar Rudolph	John Whedon	April 8, 1959
Mary's friend Babs Keppler (Melinda Plowman) is upset because she thinks her parents, Myra (Mary Lawrence) and Jack, are breaking up. Jeff overhears and tells Donna. Myra tells Babs that despite their fight, her and Jack are not splitting up. Donna is afraid the family might "drift apart" if they do not spend more time together. Alex and Donna make an effort to talk to the kids and Jeff and Mary wonder why. When a card game turns into a family fight, the kids think Donna and Alex may be the next couple to split up. The next morning, Mary tells Babs about the fight. Myra comes over to console Donna and Donna thinks she wants to talk about Jack. Jack returns from a business trip and also comes to the Stone house. Donna and Alex are surprised to see the two so happy to see each other. The two couples find out that no one is splitting up.
30	30	"The Hero"	Oscar Rudolph	Teleplay by John Whedon; Story by Nate Monaster	April 15, 1959
Biff Jameson (Ben Gage), Alex's old college roommate and former Rose Bowl star, comes to visit. Alex thinks Biff has lost all the fun in him. During dinner, Alex has to leave to make a house call. Biff tells Donna it must be nice to be needed like that. Biff says that everyone's opinion of him is based upon his past glory and he is tired of living in the past. His job has him just speaking about his football days. The next day Biff is about to play football with a bunch of Jeff's friends. Mary comes by with George Haskell (Jimmy Hawkins), who is the captain of the school football team. George knocks Biff down and injures him. Alex brings Biff to a luncheon where he is to talk to potential clients. His boss, Harry, is upset because he is late. Biff tells Harry off and quits. Donna and Alex suggest he stay in town and get a job helping young boys. He likes the idea, but he does not think his wife Martha would want to move. Biff calls her and she is willing to go along with his idea. Gordon Gebert as Stanley.
31	31	"Do You Trust Your Child?"	Oscar Rudolph	Jerry Davis & Tom August	April 22, 1959
Helen Brooks (Florida Friebus) would like Alex to speak at a PTA meeting about parent-child relationships. If he cannot make it, Helen wants Donna to do it. At first Donna does not want to do it, but Alex has other plans. After the successful PTA speech, all of Hilldale considers Donna an authority on teen parenting. Donna adopts the belief that children are capable of making good decisions on their own. Helen asks Donna's advice regarding Leonard Glenn (Richard Tyler), the annoying young man who is dating her daughter Nancy (Roberta Shore). Donna advises Helen to "have faith", predicting that Nancy will make the right decision. Leonard and Nancy come by the house for a double date with Mary and Herbert. Leonard comes off as a bit of a know-it-all. The next morning Helen tells Donna that Nancy has lost all interest in Leonard. Donna's beliefs are tested when Mary wants to date Leonard. Alex tells Donna she has to practice what she preached. After an evening with him, Mary tells Donna that she also lost interest in Leonard. Donna is asked to speak at another meeting and she turns it down.
32	32	"Grateful Patient"	Oscar Rudolph	Nate Monaster	April 29, 1959
Alex rushes to offer medical assistance to neighbor Celia Wilgus, who has been accidentally hit with a golf iron by her husband Wilbur. Alex refuses to take any money from Wilbur. The next day Mr. Alexander, an interior decorator, comes by because Donna wants to recover her couch. Later, Celia and Wilbur come by. Because he will not accept a fee for his services, Celia wants Alex to go in on a real estate deal with Wilbur. Wilbur says they have a chance to triple their money in one month. Alex says he will think about it. The rest of the family is very excited. Celia tells Donna she should do some other remodeling in the house and Mr. Alexander makes some suggestions. The kids think of things they can buy. Alex urges caution to no avail. The family learns that the deal fell through. Celia needs Alex's help because she accidentally hit Wilbur with the golf iron. A grateful Wilbur says he has another real estate deal for Alex.
33	33	"The Testimonial"	Oscar Rudolph	Nate Monaster	May 6, 1959
Jeff brings home Willie Pearson, who hurt himself playing football. Willie says that his mother would prefer Dr. Mathew Jason (James Bell). Mrs. Pearson and Dr. Jason arrive at the Stone house. Willie will be OK and he and his mother leave. Dr. Jason tells Donna and Alex that after 41 years, he plans to retire. Donna goes to the City Council and speaks with the Mayor (Harry Cheshire). They decide to have a retirement dinner with testimonials from Dr. Jason's patients and peers. Donna talks with Mrs. Jason (Olive Blakeney), who is happy Mathew is finally retiring. After speaking with Mathew, Donna gets the feeling he does not really want to retire. It is almost time for the retirement dinner. Alex gets a call from Mrs. Douglas asking him to come by to see Jimmy. Donna finds a way for Dr. Jason to make the house call. At the dinner, Mathew announces that he is not retiring.
34	34	"Miss Lovelace Comes to Tea"	Oscar Rudolph	Henry Sharp	May 13, 1959
Donna's work running a charity campaign leaves her with no time for housework. When they decide to hire a maid, the family learns maids are hard to find. Meanwhile, Jeff keeps losing his pet mouse, Herman. Despite not having any references, Mrs. Lovelace (Estelle Winwood), who is English, is hired. Mrs. Westcott Trilling (Margaret Dumont), a sponsor of the charity campaign, tells Donna she does not like the way things are being run. It is not long before the rest of the family discovers that Mrs. Lovelace is not really able to cook or clean. Soon, Jeff is vacuuming, Mary is cooking, and Alex is making beds, so Donna does not find out. Donna is to meet with Mrs. Trilling at the house, but she is running late. Donna calls and asks Mrs. Lovelace to keep Mrs. Trilling from leaving. Donna finally gets home and Mrs. Trilling is gone. She discovers that the kids have been doing all the housework. Mrs. Lovelace explains to Donna why, before her husband passed away, she never had to do any housework because they had servants. Mrs. Lovelace did wind up helping Donna in a more important way. She got Mrs. Trilling to make a very large donation to the campaign. Donna thinks that Mrs. Lovelace should run the campaign. Esther Dale as Mrs. Abrogast, a potential maid.
35	35	"Tomorrow Comes Too Soon"	Oscar Rudolph	Nate Monaster	May 20, 1959
Alex and Donna are both tired of the day to day routine with the kids. Alex suggests he and Donna try to get away for a weekend without the children. The next day things are just as hectic. Alex tells Donna that he is booked for the next three weekends. Mary begs her parents to let her go on a weekend trip with her girlfriend Jeannie. Jeff is then able to spend the weekend with a friend. Alex and Donna now have their relaxing time to be alone. One night the two go out to dinner. Donna wonders if she should call Jeff to say goodnight. Phil and Patty (Joan Tompkins) stop by their table. They mention how their children, who are only a little older than Jeff and Mary, are never around. Back at home, Donna reminisces about the children when they were younger. Donna then dreams about Mary bringing home Jim, the boy she will marry. Donna is thrilled when the children come home and things return to the normal hectic pace.
36	36	"Advice to Young Lovers"	Oscar Rudolph	John Whedon	May 27, 1959
After a fight with boyfriend George, Mary announces, "I'm through with boys!" Mary thinks he has something for her friend Babs. Donna tells Mary about the time a girl named Gloria had her sights set on Alex. Donna explains what she did about it and it included duck hunting in the rain. In order to renew George's interest, Donna advises Mary to show an interest in another boy named Tooey. Donna gets upset when Mary lets Babs borrow a jacket. Donna gives Mary advice on how to act with Tooey at the dance that evening. Hopefully, George will get jealous. George comes by and tells Mary that he did not ask Babs to the dance, she asked him. They talk things over and wind up getting back together. Donna takes credit for what happened and Alex tells her she had nothing to do with it. Both Donna and Alex envision being with another partner.
37	37	"Operation Deadbeat"	Oscar Rudolph	Si Rose & Seaman Jacobs	June 3, 1959
Jeff is living beyond his means and has been borrowing money from Mary. Alex gives Mary the money that Jeff owed her. Alex wants Jeff to learn the value of money and pay him back. When Donna tries to get Alex to forgive the debt, they discuss the patients who still owe Alex for his services. There are quite a few and Donna decides to collect on those bills. Donna tries to subtly remind TV repairman Jesse Finsterwald (Alan Reed) that he owes Alex money. But she winds up having to pay for a new picture tube. Jeff gets a job as a newspaper delivery boy in the early morning. Mr. McDonnell (William Keene), who just had a baby, comes by to pay Alex some of his bill. Donna's kind-heartedness comes through and tells him there is no rush. Mr. McDonnell says he ran into Jeff who told him he is working to pay off a debt. That made Mr. McDonnell want to pay some to Alex. Mr. McDonnell says that Jeff is working in the supermarket in the afternoons, which Donna did not know. Donna learns that Mr. McDonnell owes money at the supermarket. She gives Mr. Folger the money that McDonnell gave her. Despite being proud of Jeff, Alex does not want him working two jobs. Donna feels bad when she finds something out from Finsterwald.

=== Season 2 (1959–60) ===
No. overall	No. in season	Title	Directed by	Written by	Original release date
38	1	"that is Show Business"	Oscar Rudolph	Jerry Davis & Tom August	September 24, 1959
Mary is excited to be included in a school show and she will get to dance. Kenny Bruce (Lee Aaker) is a classmate who also was accepted, but he dropped out since he stutters. Mary convinces him to remain in the play and gives Kenny her lucky coin. Days later at rehearsal, Kenny's stuttering has stopped. Mr. Cooper (Herbert Lytton) pairs Kenny with Mary for a dance routine. Mary, however, is not happy about it because he is so much shorter than her. She asks Mr. Cooper to switch Kenny for someone taller. Mr. Cooper kind of guilts Mary into staying with Kenny. Something Jeff says, gives Mary an idea. She suggests to Kenny that he get lifts for his shoes and his stuttering starts again. It is the night of the show and Mary is nervous. Kenny did get lifts for his shoes. Because of the lifts, Kenny trips toward the end of the dance and pulls down Mary with him. The next morning, Mary tells Donna she will not perform at that night's show. Kenny comes by, apologizes to Mary and gives her lucky coin back. Mary has a change of heart and dances with Kenny that night, without the lifts.
39	2	"Sleep No More My Lady"	Oscar Rudolph	Henry Sharp	October 1, 1959
Donna & Alex fly to New York where Alex will give a speech at a medical convention. On the plane, Donna is so excited for Alex that she cannot sleep. Alex suggests she take a tranquilizer to help her get some rest. Donna turns it down. Alex puts a pill in some warm milk for Donna. Not knowing this and while Alex is asleep, she puts two more pills in the milk. When they finally get to the hotel, Donna is in a daze and keeps falling asleep. Dr. Brannan (Jean Paul King) comes by and tells Alex he is to give his speech in 20 minutes. At the convention, Donna is constantly dozing off and falling out of her chair. Because of this, Alex is unable to complete his speech. The next morning, Donna feels bad about what happened. Alex is not concerned. Donna gets locked out of her room. Things get confusing when Donna accidentally winds up in Dr. Elias Spaulding's (Richard Gaines) room. He is running the convention. Donna explains things to Dr. Spaulding and Alex is able to give his speech. Helen Bennett as Mrs. Spaulding.
40	3	"A Penny Earned"	Oscar Rudolph	Tom August	October 8, 1959
After Alex completes a newspaper quiz called "Test Your Wife", Donna learns she gets a perfect score for being thrifty. Donna takes a little offense at being called a penny pincher. The whole family is invited to a formal wedding that is coming up. Despite Alex saying she should get a new one, Donna plans to wear an old red dress. Meanwhile, George Collier (Raymond Bailey) wonders why his wife Louise (Irene Hervey) needs to buy a new dress for the wedding. George says that Donna wears the same dress all the time. Louise says she is sure Donna will have a new dress for this wedding. Donna tells Louise she is wearing her red dress. But, when Louise questions that decision, Donna says she will buy a new one. However, when Donna sees the price of the dress she likes, she backs down. Donna has the family go to an expensive restaurant for dinner. She tells them to order whatever they want regardless of cost. But then Donna orders a cheap meal. This backfires when the owner picks up the check. Alex is stunned at the price of the new dress Donna buys. Turns out she tricked him and only dyed the red dress and made some other changes. Mary Carver as Miss Robbins.
41	4	"A Friend Indeed"	Oscar Rudolph	Tom August	October 15, 1959
Doug is a new friend of Jeff's. Fran Shaw (Ann Morriss), Doug's mother, praises Donna for having such a wonderful, perfect child. Fran wishes some of Jeff's good manners would rub off on Doug. Jeff got in trouble at school and had to stay after. Donna gets a call from Jeff's teacher Miss Ferguson (Doreen Lang). Apparently, Jeff has been doing other bad things at school which is unusual for him. Jeff tells Donna and Alex it is not him doing the bad things and he would rather not say who is doing it. Alex is checking in on Fran's little girl. Doug and Jeff come by and Fran starts berating Doug. Alex and Donna figure out that Doug is getting Jeff in trouble because he resents that his mother is always praising Jeff. Donna comes up with a solution to the problem. She has Fran witness how Jeff really acts and how he fights with Mary. Doug comes by and is very polite to Donna.
42	5	"The First Child"	Oscar Rudolph	Nate Monaster	October 22, 1959
The Brandon's, Louise (Alice Backes) and Joe (Dave Willock), have had their first baby. The nervous couple are constantly calling Alex at all hours of the day and night about the baby. Alex does not have to be to the hospital until that afternoon, so he wants to do something with Jeff and Mary. But he gets a call from Louise. Alex goes to their house and tries to reassure them that little Norman is fine. Before Alex can even get home, Louise calls and asks Donna if he is home yet. Apparently, Norman started crying. The next day, Jeff was hoping that Alex could come to his baseball game. But Alex gets a call from the hospital. Alex and Donna go to the movies. There Alex gets a note that Louise called and is worried that Norman swallowed something. Alex and Donna get to the house and it turns out to be false alarm. The next morning Donna calls the Brandon's because they did not call during the night.
43	6	"Going Steady"	Oscar Rudolph	Nate Monaster	October 29, 1959
Mary wishes a boy named Steve would stop calling her. Meredith Penner (Sherry Alberoni), a girl that just moved near by, calls Jeff. He thinks she is a pest. Mary wants Jeff to be more friendly with Meredith so that Mary will have an excuse to meet Meredith's older brother, Don. Mary hounds Jeff to go to Meredith's party, but he refuses. Donna would like Alex to talk to Jeff. When Mary gives Jeff the money he needs for an electric motor, he agrees to go to the party. Now that Jeff is going to Meredith's party and they sat together at lunch, the whole school thinks they are going steady. He is not happy about it and does not want to go to the party. Alex and Donna insists he goes. It is the night of the party. Mary tells Donna she is going to a dance with Steve. Mary says she met Don and thinks he is a bore. Jeff is still stuck going to the party. Jeff comes home from school all excited. Meredith told him she is going steady with another boy.
44	7	"The Neighborly Gesture"	Oscar Rudolph	John Whedon	November 5, 1959
Jeff has been putting off mowing the lawn. Alex really wants him to do it today. New neighbors, Joe (Robert Nichols) and Eleanor Moody, move in next to the Stones. Jeff learns that Joe was in the Air Force and finds him very fascinating. He winds up spending the whole day there and does not get the grass cut. Jeff tells Alex all the great things that Joe can do, and Alex starts to get very jealous. The next morning Alex finds that Jeff only mowed half the lawn. Alex sends Mary over to the Moody's to get Jeff. Hours later, Mary and Jeff finally come home. Jeff talks more about the things Joe has done and Alex is getting very angry. Jeff is sent to finish the lawn, but Alex later finds it is not done. Alex sees Jeff mowing the Moody's lawn. The Stone's finally get to meet the Moody's. Joe tells Alex that all Jeff can talk about when he is over is what a great dad he has. Alex finds himself feeling a lot better.
45	8	"Nothing Like a Good Book"	Oscar Rudolph	John Whedon	November 12, 1959
Lydia Langley, a neighbor, invites the Stones over with a group of friends. Alex and Donna are not thrilled about going. Lydia is quite pretentious and spends the evening bragging about the intellectual books she reads. Donna tries to bring some culture to her children, who have no interest in it. Donna wants Alex and her to read War And Peace to set an example. Alex is not that excited either. Donna joins Lydia's book club and is told she has a couple days to give a report on War and Peace. Donna and Alex go to the meeting and Donna admits that she has not read the book. Alex asks Lydia to discuss the book as she has read it. It turns out she has only seen the movie. The next day Alex says that maybe this striving for culture is not a right fit for the Stone family. J. Edward McKinley as Professor Peabody. Frank Wilcox as Bartley Langley, Lydia's husband. Margie Liszt as Vera Platt.
46	9	"Flowers for the Teacher"	Oscar Rudolph	John Whedon	November 19, 1959
Donna is furious that she is constantly picking up after Jeff. The new school year has started for Jeff. Jeff complains that Miss McGinnis (Marion Ross), the new teacher at school, hates him and the other boys. The next day, Jeff claims to be sick, but Alex believes he is faking it. Alex gets several calls from parents saying their sons do not feel well. they are all boys from Jeff's class. Donna visits Miss McGinnis and finds she is actually afraid of the students as it is her first teaching experience. Miss McGinnis thinks she may have been too strict with the children, especially the boys. Donna thinks she may have an idea. Donna finds a way to have Jeff be a leader and convince the other children that the teacher is not that bad.
47	10	"All Mothers Worry"	Oscar Rudolph	Nate Monaster	November 26, 1959
Jeff's friend Phillip changes at Jeff's home after football practices. Phil has not told his mother because she worries about him and she is always afraid he will get hurt. Donna finds out and realizes Margaret Dorsey (Ann Doran), Phillip's mother, does not know he is playing football. Margaret comes by the house to talk to Donna. Jeff and Phil come home and Margaret sees Phil in his football clothes. Jeff's all excited when he learns that the L.A. Rams will be playing a pre-season game at the local stadium. Donna suggests that Jeff get an extra ticket for Phil. Alex's old friend Bert Rose (William Schallert) comes by his office. Bert is now the Ram's publicist and gives Alex passes to the game. Phil comes by the house and tells Donna he quit the team. Alex takes the boys to see the Rams practice and they get to meet some of the players. Phil gets hurt during a scrimmage. Later, Alex and Jeff go to the game. Donna, Margaret and Phil watch the game on TV. On TV, the Rams award the game ball to Phil and wish him well. After talking with Donna, Margaret now understands that she has to let Phil be a boy. After dropping off the ball to Phil, a couple of the players come by the Stone house and give Jeff a ball as well. Note: L.A. Rams players Sid Gillman, Jon Arnett, Bill Wade, Don Burroughs and Les Richter make an appearance.
48	11	"Jeff Joins a Club"	Oscar Rudolph	Tom August	December 3, 1959
Walter Pearson, a new kid in town, follows Jeff around all the time, no matter how many times Jeff tries to lose him. Walter tends to brag about the things he has. Jeff and Walter want to join an exclusive club, The Friends of Outer Space. They have to do several things and one is to remain silent until that evening. The next day, they have to stay up the entire night outside. During the night, Donna comes out to keep Jeff company and they both fall asleep. Donna speaks to Walter's mother and learns the club turned him down. Jeff tells Donna and Alex he was turned down as well. Jeff finds out that he was turned down because he is a friend of Walters. When Jeff tells the club Walter is not his friend, they allow him to join. Walter tells Jeff he knows the club would not let Jeff in because of him. Walter says he will not bother him anymore. Jeff decides the club cannot tell him who he can be friends with. Donna helps the two boys start their own club. It is not long before the other boys want to join.
49	12	"The Punishment"	Oscar Rudolph	Nate Monaster	December 10, 1959
Donna is upset when Mary and Jeff arrive home late and she grounds them both for the coming weekend. Each one had something planned, but Donna does not care. Alex comes home and it is all smiles for dad from Mary and Jeff. Donna is upset because she is always the one to yell at the children. Alex tells Donna that he will stand by her punishment. The next day Donna writes down all the things the children did wrong and wants Alex to reprimand them. Somehow Donna still winds up being the bad guy. Now, neither Donna nor Alex want to punish Mary or Jeff because neither of them want to seem like the bad parent. This goes on for several days and Mary and Jeff start to wonder what is going on. One night Alex and Donna come home and the kids have prepared dinner. Donna wants to unground them but Alex thinks the punishment should stand. In the end, Alex and Donna rescind the punishment and the kids can go about their plans. Robert Ellis as Young Man.
50	13	"A Difference of Opinion"	Ida Lupino	Nate Monaster	December 17, 1959
Mary comes home and says she had to leave her friends house because her parents were having a loud argument. Mary says she is glad Donna and Alex get along. Donna is forced to accept a dinner party invitation from Phyllis Baker (Ann Rutherford). She and her husband Harry are a couple that neither Donna nor Alex enjoy. This causes an argument between them whether to go or not go. They try to hide their fights about it from Mary and Jeff, but the kids know something is going on. Alex finally agrees to go. At the party, Donna and Alex do their best to appear as though they are having a good time. Back at home, the kids hear their parents arguing again. During the night, Donna and Alex wake up and apologize to each other. The next morning, the kids ask about the fight. Everyone comes to an understanding. Hal Smith as Rod, a guest at the dinner party.
51	14	"The Homecoming Dance"	Robert Ellis Miller	John Whedon	December 24, 1959
Donna will not let Jeff sleep outside in a tent with his friend Eddie. Mary's friend Herbie Bailey (Tommy Ivo) invites her to a dance at a nearby college with a blind date. She would have to stay overnight in the dormitory. Donna is against it because she thinks Mary is too young and she does not like the idea of a blind date. Alex has a talk with Mary about boys, but somehow the conversation drifts to playing golf. Donna agrees to let her go, but only because they are going to drive her there and back. Donna and Alex will also spend the weekend by the college. Jeff can go to his friends house. On the drive there, Alex gets lost. He tries to make up time by speeding, but gets stopped by the police. They finally get to the hotel. Mary is upset that she could not stay at the dormitory with the rest of the girls. Herbie comes by. Stan, Mary's blind date, turns out to be a bit obnoxious and Donna starts to worry. At the dance, Stan keeps taking Mary outside and tries to get her to kiss him. But Mary turns the tables on him. Mary also finds out that her parents are behind a bush nearby. When Mary gets back, Donna apologizes for spying on her.
52	15	"The Lucky Girl"	Oscar Rudolph	Nate Monaster	December 31, 1959
It seems as if all of Donna's friends are complimenting her on having such a wonderful husband and he is so good looking. They say that she is such a lucky girl. Donna gets a call saying that all the women at the Nursery Board just raved about the speech Alex gave there yesterday. Betty Murdock (Kristine Miller) comes by and compliments Alex to Donna. At the beauty shop, a woman Donna does not even know says that whoever the wife of Alex Stone is, she is a very lucky woman. Donna begins to think that the women believe she is not good enough for Alex and that it was just pure luck she got such a guy. Donna and Alex go to see a play. They run into Betty and Jane Lawrence (Mona Knox). Betty and Jane ask Alex what he thinks of the play, because they want his insight. Alex tries to steer the conversation to Donna. A crowd of women form around Alex and Donna is pushed to the side. At home, Donna is very upset. Alex has to leave on a house call. Jeff starts to feel bad and Donna tries to track down Alex. Alex comes home and figures out that Jeff just ate too much. Donna realizes that Alex is a great man. Margie Liszt as Beauty Operator.
53	16	"The Broken Spirit"	Lawrence Dobkin	Nate Monaster	January 7, 1960
Jeff's been causing problems lately, so Alex has a talk with him about behaving. While on his paper route, Jeff throws Mr. Barnhill's (Raymond Hatton) newspaper on the front stairs. Mr. Barnhill stops Jeff and reminds him that he is not to throw the paper on the stairs. The next day, Jeff throws the paper on the stairs again. That evening the family learns from Alex that Mr. Barnhill had broken his leg falling on the stairs. Jeff tells his friend Timmy that he thinks it is his fault Mr. Barnhill broke his leg. Jeff is on his best behavior and everyone thinks it is because of the talk. Jeff wonders why Mr. Barnhill has not told on him yet. Donna is worried that instead of discipline they have instilled fear in Jeff. Jeff says he is going out to buy some flowers. Donna thinks he is buying them for her. When Jeff visits Mr. Barnhill in the hospital, he finds out that the man tripped down the cellar stairs. Mr. Barnhill calls Donna and tells her that Jeff was the only visitor he had. Jeff goes back to acting the way he did before.
54	17	"The Secret"	Norman Tokar	Nate Monaster	January 14, 1960
Donna catches Jeff listening in on Mary's phone call. Mary's friend Carol (Roberta Shore) comes by and asks Mary to keep a secret. Carol is engaged to Matthew Morgan, but does not want her family to know. Carol asks Mary to hide the ring and have her boyfriend's letters sent to the Stone residence. Donna sees Mary hide a little box. Donna tells Alex that she can tell that Mary is hiding something from her. Donna's birthday is coming up and maybe that was a gift. Mary tells Donna she is getting her a sweater for her birthday. Jeff brings in the mail and there is a letter for Mary from Matthew. Mary makes up a story as to who Matthew is. Jeff shows Donna the ring Mary hid. Alex and Donna are worried that Mary might be getting married. Alex tells Mary there is a long distance call for her. Mary tells Donna that she will be able to meet Matt this Saturday. It is Saturday evening and Matthew comes by. When Carol shows up, Alex and Donna learn the truth. Carol tells Matthew that her parents now know.
55	18	"The New Mother"	Oscar Rudolph	John Whedon	January 21, 1960
Jeff is supposed to be watching a dog for some friends while they are away. Donna finds out Jeff is being paid for it and she is doing all the work. David Barker (Charles Herbert) has run away from his boarding school and returns again to the Stone house. David tells Jeff to not tell the rest of the family. Jeff has David hide in the basement. Donna catches Jeff with a sleeping bag and a sandwich that he was taking to David. Colonel Woodward, from the school, calls looking for David. Donna figures out that David is in the basement. She does not tell Alex, but he suspects something. Donna talks to David. He tells her that Major Barker (John Bryant), his father, is getting remarried. David recalls his father bringing Helen to the school. David is told he will have to stay in the boarding school instead of being with his father and new mother until things are settled. David tells Donna he is never going back to the school. Alex overhears the conversation and calls the school. The next morning Major Barker comes to the Stone house. He explains to David that he is not getting married after all. It seems Helen was not interested in being a mother to David. Note: This was the last of Charles Herbert's four appearances on The Donna Reed Show.
56	19	"Just a Housewife"	Oscar Rudolph	Nate Monaster	January 28, 1960
Jerry Parker (Jerry Hausner) is a gimmicky radio showman broadcasting from a grocery store. He interviews Dorothy Burns (Elaine Riley), who says she is a housewife. Jerry then talks to Donna and calls her "just a housewife". He thinks he is funny when he asks her a silly question about cooking. Donna tells Alex that she took offense at being thought of as just being a housewife. Mary agrees with Donna and Alex and Jeff just make light of the whole thing. When a salesman comes by and says "typical housewife", Donna slams the door in his face. Donna confronts Jerry Parker again and tells him that women can be more than just housewives. Jim (C. Lindsay Workman), a friend of Alex's, tells him his wife heard Donna on the radio. All the women in the neighborhood congratulate Donna and she becomes a local celebrity. Alex comes home and tells Donna that it will not be long before everyone forgets what she said. The salesman comes by again and because of something else he says, Donna slams the door in his face. Constance Moore as Doris.
57	20	"The Free Soul"	Norman Tokar	Frank Tarloff (as David Adler)	February 4, 1960
Dan Harris (Myron McCormick), a friend of Alex's father, makes a surprise visit to the Stones. Over lunch, Dan tells the family of his exciting travels. Jeff is completely mesmerized by the stories and wants to be a free soul like Dan. One day, Dan asks Donna to go to the zoo with him, but she has things to do around the house. Alex learns that Jeff just left school after lunch and did not return. Jeff tells Alex and Donna that he just did not feel like staying there. Donna tells Alex that after talking with Dan, she left the dishes, went for a walk in the park and then fed the elephants at the zoo. Alex tells Dan what Jeff did. Just then, Mrs. Sutton (Aline Towne), a mother of one of Jeff's friends, comes by. She mentions some of Jeff's unusual behavior with her son Freddy. Dan overhears this. Jeff tells his parents that Dan is leaving for Africa and asked him to go with. Alex and Donna play along. Dan manages to get Jeff to come back to reality. Charles Wagenheim as Vendor.
58	21	"The First Quarrel"	Robert Ellis Miller	Nate Monaster	February 11, 1960
Donna and Alex are talking about their friends Jim and Alice Burke (Olive Sturgess). They have only been married a few years and have a baby. Alice comes by and tells Donna she never wants to see Jim again. They had their first real quarrel. Donna gives Alice some advice on how to get back together. Alice says for the sake of the baby, she will do it. Alex tells Donna that she should stay out of it. Jim asks Alex what he should do. Alex claims he is staying out of it, but he gives Jim contrary advice. Alice and Jim have another fight. When Donna finds out what Alex did, they have a quarrel as well. Donna and Alex wanted to get Alice and Jim together at a restaurant. Donna finds out that Jim and Alice apologized to each other and everything is fine. At the restaurant, Donna and Alex work out their differences.
59	22	"A Place to Go"	Norman Tokar	John Whedon	February 18, 1960
Jeff manages to get nail polish on Donna, Mary and Alex's clothes. Donna's Womans Club is looking for a project. Jeff and two of his friends find an abandoned building and decide to make it a secret clubhouse. A policeman catches them and takes them to the station. Sgt. McDermott (Stafford Repp) calls Alex and tells him what happened. Alex then tells Donna about the boys in the abandoned building. The women decide to build a proper gathering place for the children in that building. Donna and Myra Keppler go to talk to Matthew Sarples (Lester Vail), the real estate man. Sarples owns the building and the women find a way to be able to use it for a year. Donna then manages to get some money from George Heiser (Howard Wendell), the bank president. They ask several other local businessmen for donations. The women fix the youth house up so nice, the boys have no interest in playing there. The boys went to the dump to play. Ann Morriss as Eleanor Moody.
60	23	"A Night to Howl"	Lawrence Dobkin	John Whedon	February 25, 1960
Mary discovers poetry. She now thinks her girlfriends are shallow because all they talk about are boys. Mary asks Donna if her and Alex have lost their passion for life. She feels bad that they are stuck in a routine. Mary even asks Alex about it. To try to be spontaneous, Donna and Alex decide to go out to dinner on a Monday night and leave the kids home. It does not go as planned. The first place they go to is closed. They wind up at an Italian restaurant where the Waiter (Mario Siletti), and then the Chef, push the spaghetti because that is all they have. Despite being over dressed, they then go to a small diner. Things do not go well there and they leave without eating. They go home and eat leftovers. They both realize that neither one wanted to go out and have a good laugh. Later, they tell Mary and Jeff that they went everywhere and had a great time. Richard Reeves as Construction Worker.
61	24	"The Editorial"	Lawrence Dobkin	Nate Monaster	March 3, 1960
Jeff is promoted to editor of his school newspaper. Alex tells the family that he will probably be made head of pediatrics at the hospital. The Board has to finalize it, but that should just be a formality. In his first editorial Jeff speaks out against too much homework. Mrs. Walters tells Jeff it is a well written piece, but the teachers do not think it should be published. Jeff is quite upset, but Donna and Alex try to tell him to trust the teachers judgement. Jeff prints the piece on his own and hands them out at school. Because of that, Mrs. Walters fires him from the paper. Alex tells Jeff that Mrs. Walters was right in what she did. Jeff then leads a homework boycott in his class. Mrs. Walters calls Donna and tells her what is going on. Alex tells the family another doctor was named head of pediatrics. Something Alex says about his disappointment gets Jeff to learn there may be a better way to get his point across. Jeff ends the boycott and gets his job as editor back.
62	25	"The Gentle Dew"	Norman Tokar	John Whedon	March 10, 1960
It seems Mary and Jeff are not always doing their homework or chores and Alex is not happy about it. Alex decides to lay down the rules and make sure everyone sticks to them. Donna thinks the rules are a bit harsh. Mary goes out on a date with Roger and Alex tells her to be home by 9:30. While on the date, Mary gets mad at Roger because he talked to Darlene. Alex and Donna go to Ben and Kay (Aline Towne) Wiley's house to play cards. They talk about their children and rules. In the middle of a game, Alex goes home at 9:30 to check up on Mary and Donna goes with. It is now 10:00 and Alex believes she is intentionally staying out late. Donna calls Roger's house and finds out he is not home either. An angry Alex goes out looking for Mary. He finds Roger at the malt shop. Roger says that Mary walked out on him. Alex comes home and he is more upset than before. Mary comes walking down the stairs. Turns out she was home and in bed by 9:00.
63	26	"The Fatal Leap"	Andrew McCullough	John Whedon	March 17, 1960
Jack Richards (Jack Albertson) comes by and tells Alex that Moose Edwards is getting married. Jack tells Donna that Moose was Alex's college roommate. Moose always had some wild nights and lots of dates. Donna runs into Madeline Richards (Florence MacMichael). Madeline tells Donna how excited Jack is about going to Moose's bachelor party. Donna is surprised to learn that Alex was invited as well. Alex admits to Donna that he was invited. Donna is worried about what might happen, because she thinks Alex envies Moose's prior lifestyle. Alex leaves for the party and Donna and Madeline keep each other company. At the party, the men learn that Moose has given up his partying ways and is quite dull now. Moose's future father-in-law, Dr. Wiggins (Sam Flint), arrives and he is a reverend. The party becomes very awkward. Back at home, Donna dreams about the wild time the men are having with dancing girls. Alex comes home and tells Donna what a boring time he had.
64	27	"The Perfect Pitch"	Norman Tokar	Tom & Helen August	March 24, 1960
Jeff is excited to try out for the track team and even plans to practice to get in shape for the tryouts. But then he gets tired walking four blocks to the market. Donna finds out Jeff has perfect pitch in music. Alex offers to coach Jeff in track. Donna thinks Jeff should take music lessons and learn the trumpet. Jeff has had some trumpet lessons and he is not enjoying it. Mr. Barrowy, Jeff's trumpet teacher, cannot bring himself to tell Donna that Jeff is not that good. Alex and Mary think Jeff is getting worse. Donna tells Alex that Jeff should have a better trumpet. Alex would rather buy Jeff some track shoes. Alex and Donna ask band leader Larry Waggner to look at Jeff's trumpet. Larry plays the trumpet and it sounds great. Larry says that Jeff just does not have any musical talent. Donna finally agrees to stop making Jeff take lessons.
65	28	"Pickles for Charity"	Norman Tokar	Nate Monaster	April 7, 1960
The Woman's Medical Auxiliary host a dance event. While the dance was a success, they wound up with a large deficit. Each member of the Auxiliary decides to make up her share and raise money to pay for the dance deficit. Alex thinks Donna should just pay the money. Donna decides to sell homemade pickles. Mr. Ross (William Newell), the grocer, agrees to let Donna sell her pickles at his store. Jeff and Mary help Donna jar the pickles. Because she has a dentist appointment, Donna lets Jeff and Mary sell the pickles at the store. The two are not having any luck selling them. Alex comes by and, without Donna knowing, buys up all the pickles. They then give the pickles away. Donna comes back and is thrilled that the pickles are all gone. Later, Donna finds out what Alex did, but she is not angry. Tiger Fafara as Charlie, a boy who works at the grocery.
66	29	"Mary's Growing Pain"	Lawrence Dobkin	John Whedon	April 14, 1960
Jeff is leaving for a hike and Mary is to go on a ski trip. Alex and Donna are looking forward to an empty home. Mary decides to not go on the ski trip when her friend Roger says he is driving up with another girl. She is disappointed and feels she is unattractive. However, when Dr. Somers, an intern from the hospital, visits Alex at his home, her mood lightens up immediately. Mary is completely fascinated with him. Roger calls Mary wondering why she did not go on the trip. She brushes him off. That night, Mary has a dream about spending her life with Dr. Somers. The next morning, Donna reminds Mary of the age difference and gives her some other advice. Flowers arrive for Mary. Because the note says from an unknown admirer, Mary thinks they are from Dr. Somers. Alex tells Donna he sent the flowers to cheer Mary up. Dr. Somers comes by and asks Mary to the movies. Mary gets offended when he says that she reminds him of his kid sister. But she feels better when she sees a picture of the sister. Roger comes by and Mary asks him to go to the movies with her and Dr. Somers.
67	30	"Alex Runs the House"	Lawrence Dobkin	Tom & Helen August	April 21, 1960
Jeff boards a plane to go visit his Uncle and Aunt on their farm by himself. That night Donna is worried about Jeff, but then they get a telegram that he arrived safely. It is a week before they hear from him again. Because Donna is worried and misses Jeff so much, Alex suggests she go to the farm as well. Donna does not think she should leave Alex and Mary to fend for themselves. Donna's friend Wilma (Renee Godfrey) tells her she should go so Alex can see how much he needs her. Something Alex says makes Donna decide to make the trip. Alex and Mary have to take care of the house and meals while she is gone and it does not go well. Alex decides it is smarter to wash the dishes every four days. Meanwhile, Donna and Jeff are getting homesick. Alex and Mary get a telegram that Donna and Jeff are coming home early and will arrive in a couple hours. Alex puts all the dirty dishes back in the cupboards. When Donna comes home, Alex tells her that they managed just fine. Donna discovers that was not quite true when she finds the dishes. Alex goes to wash the dishes and learns that Donna has done them.
68	31	"The Career Woman"	Lawrence Dobkin	Nate Monaster	April 28, 1960
Donna gets a telegram from Molly Duncan (Esther Williams), an old friend. She is now a well-known fashion designer and has been all around the world. Molly arrives and tells Donna she is engaged to a doctor named David (Richard Garland). The problem is that David wants to practice in a small town. Molly does not know if she could take being married to a small town doctor. Molly meets the children and is envious of Donna. Later, Donna and Molly talk about the men in Molly's life that did not work out. Molly asks Donna if she regrets not pursuing acting. Donna says she does not. Donna and Molly are at a restaurant. Dr. Jim Folger comes by and thanks Donna for her work on the hospital fund. Molly sees Donna has a full life. Donna has Molly attempt to make the dinner. When David shows up, he tells Molly he will not marry her. Donna and Alex find a way to get the two together. Morgan Jones as John the Waiter.
69	32	"Jeff, the Financial Genius"	Hy Averback	Henry Sharp	May 5, 1960
Jeff asks Alex for an advance on his allowance to buy items for his latest project. When that fails, he tries borrowing from everyone. Alex finds out Jeff owes a lot of people money, and puts Jeff on a strict budget until he pays everyone back. Jeff takes to selling and trading many of his possessions at bargain basement prices. Alex talks to Jeff and suggests he try and make better deals. Donna thinks Alex should just give him the advance. Alex decides to show Jeff how to make a better deal. He takes Jeff to see Mr. Sprague (Herb Vigran), the Swap Shop owner. Alex thinks he is showing Jeff a smart way to trade but winds up getting taken. Alex gives Jeff the advance. In the end, it is Jeff that winds up making the best deals.
70	33	"Mary's Crusade"	Lawrence Dobkin	Nate Monaster	May 12, 1960
Mary's friend Ellen is very smart at school, but plain looking. No one asks her out. Meanwhile, Jeff tries to explain to Alex why he did not get a good grade for effort. Mary decides to give Ellen a makeover to show the boys in school that Ellen is just as pretty as she is smart. At the malt shop, every boy that Mary and Ellen start to talk to winds up going to popular girl Melanie's (Carole Wells) table. Mary promises Ellen she will not go to the upcoming dance unless she can get Ellen a date. Mary starts to regret her promise because she really wants to go to the dance. Bert Singleton calls and asks Mary to the dance. She really wants to go with him, but does not give him a definite answer. Ellen tells Mary she has been invited to another party and wants Mary to go to the dance. Donna finds out that Ellen made the party up, so Mary, to keep her promise, turns down an invite from Bert. A fortunate turn of events allows both girls to go to the dance. Anthony 'Scooter' Teague as Don. Barbara Luddy as Ellen's Mother.
71	34	"The First Time We Met"	Robert Ellis Miller	Nate Monaster	May 19, 1960
Donna & Alex have very different memories of how they originally met. Alex introduces Donna to Dr. Hank Landers (Bob Hastings). Hank is single and Alex tells Donna he would like to stay that way. They invite Hank over for dinner. Donna and Mary try to think of a woman to set Hank up with. Alex overhears them and tells Donna to forget it. Hank comes over and Donna discusses setting a man up with someone. Hank asks how the two of them met. The men learn that Florence will be coming by. She does come by to drop off a list and she says she is married. Donna finds out that Nurse Pat Archer (Kaye Elhardt) is very interested in Hank. Hank asks Pat if she would like to get a cup of coffee. Pat panics and says no. It turns out Hank is interested in Pat. Donna finds a way to get Hank to ask Pat out. C. Lindsay Workman as Dr. Kane.
72	35	"The Gossip"	Robert Ellis Miller	Frank Tarloff as David Adler	May 26, 1960
Emily (Elisabeth Fraser) comes by Donna's house and brings up Margaret. But then she cannot say anything else because she promised not to. Donna's friend Kay (Maxine Cooper) calls and tells her that she is pregnant. Emily tells Donna about Margaret and Donna tells her about Kay. Alex tells Donna that Kay wanted her pregnancy to be a secret. Kay is afraid she might lose her job if her boss finds out. Donna goes to see Emily and Emily claims she did not tell anyone about Kay. Mary tells Donna she heard about Kay. Donna now worries that it will not be long before it is all over town. Donna feels horrible that she was the start of the gossip. That night, Kay and her husband Ralph come by. Kay clearly does not know that the secret is out. The next morning Donna gets upset when Jeff starts gossiping about a friend. Alex tells Donna that Ralph wants Kay to give up her job. So if word of her pregnancy gets to her boss, it does not matter. But, it turns out, Donna is not the only one to start gossip. Even Kay comes by and apologizes to Donna that she gossiped about her. Sheila Bromley as Margaret Harrison. Almira Sessions as Elsie, Kay's housekeeper.
73	36	"Love's Sweet Awakening"	Robert Ellis Miller	Frank Tarloff	June 2, 1960
Alex says he just talked to George (Dan Tobin) and Ruth Handler (Jeanne Bates). Their son Petey has returned home for a visit while on break from military school. Since Petey was a favorite friend of Mary and Jeff, he visits the Stones. Petey is smitten by Mary's grown-up looks. Ruth tells Alex that Petey has been acting strangely and has no appetite, which is unusual for him. Alex says he will check him out. Alex tells Ruth that Petey is clearly infatuated with Mary. Ruth tells George to talk to Petey and give him some encouragement. Petey tries to ask Mary out, but she does not give him a second thought romantically. Donna says she will talk to Mary, but he asks her to not say anything. Donna calls Ruth and has a suggestion for Petey to get Mary's attention. That plan does not work at all. Mary's friend Melanie (Carole Wells) tells her how impressed she was by men in uniform when she was in Europe. Donna calls Ruth and tells her to send Petey over in his uniform. Melanie tells Mary how good looking Petey is in his uniform. Suddenly Mary wants Petey to take her to Melanie's party.
74	37	"The Wedding Present"	Hy Averback	Phil Sharp	June 9, 1960
Donna and her friend Louise Barnett (Molly Dodd) are to meet a very influential woman named Mrs. Manning (Harriet MacGibbon) at the decorators. Donna is having a hard time deciding what to wear. Donna and Louise arrive at the shop and both are dressed quite fancy. Mrs. Manning shows up dressed very casual. While there, and to impress Mrs. Manning, Donna thinks about purchasing an expensive Dresden figurine. Mr. Jason (Tommy Farrell), of the decorator shop, agrees to let her take it home and think about it. Alex comes home very upset, because he had a rough day. To make matters worse, a woman driver backs into his car's fender. Alex complains about what it will cost to fix. Donna hides the figurine. Alex gets a telegram saying his Aunt Lettie will stop by for a couple hours that evening on her way to Chicago. Alex says they have to put out her wedding gift. Not remembering what gift she gave, Alex puts out the figurine along with many ugly things he finds in the attic. Mrs. Manning and Mr. Jason show up and see all the ugly things, much to Donna's embarrassment. Alex gets a phone call from Aunt Lettie saying she will not be able to come by after all. She also said she had a gift for them as she never gave them a wedding present. The next day, Alex says that Mr. Jason traded all the junk pieces they had for the Dresden figurine.
75	38	"Cool Cat"	Andrew McCullough	Jacqueline Trotte	June 16, 1960
A stray cat follows Jeff home from school. The family votes whether to allow "Harry the cat" to stay. Alex and Donna vote to take the cat back to where Jeff first saw it. Jeff and Mary vote to keep it. Alex bribes Mary with an advance on her allowance and she changes her vote. The next day, Alex drops the cat off. The kids are upset when they learn that Harry is gone. But, Harry comes back and the kids are thrilled. Turns out the cat is female, and slowly brings her family of kittens into the house. Jeff finds the four kittens in his closet and shows the family. They all agree that Harry can stay, but the kittens have to go. It takes some doing, but Jeff and Mary give the kittens away. Alex reads the paper and finds out the kittens are pedigree and worth $100 each. The next morning Donna leaves the house early. Turns out she went to the pound and got 4 other kittens to trade for Harry's kittens. Jimmy Hawkins as Jerry Hager.

=== Season 3 (1960–61) ===
No. overall	No. in season	Title	Directed by	Written by	Original release date
76	1	"Weekend"	Andrew McCullough	Sam Adams	September 15, 1960
Donna has had a long day and wants to go to bed early. But she cannot sleep because Mary has friends over and they are playing records. During the night, Alex and Donna get up. To break the routine, Alex suggests the two go away to somewhere different for an extended weekend. The kids can come for the last day. Alex and Donna find a charming place to go to. But, when they arrive, the actual accommodations are nothing like the fancy place they saw in the brochure. The meals are no better. Alex goes fishing and catches nothing. They decide that they will leave early. But, they talk to the owners, Charlie & Sunny Cooper (Parker Fennelly and Mary Treen), and feel sorry for them. The Coopers just cannot make a go of the resort. Alex and Donna decide to stay. The kids show up. Charlie tells them there are no fish in the lake but a creek near by is full of them. After finding out how much hunting and fishing there could be, Alex tells the Coopers to make their place into a Hunting resort. Lorraine Miller as Woman.
77	2	"The Mystery Woman"	Norman Tokar	Barbara Avedon	September 22, 1960
Mary comes home from a date with Herbie (Tommy Ivo) and tells him what a wonderful time she had. She says she will go to the dance with him. After he leaves, Mary tells Alex and Donna what a horrible time she had. she is hoping Roger will ask her to the dance. Alex insists she go to the dance with Herbie. While eating lunch with Mary at a restaurant, a woman named Wanda Harman (Andrea King) approaches Donna as a long lost friend. Donna has no idea who the woman is. Jeff tells Mary he saw Roger over at Susie's house. The woman calls and invites Donna & Alex to dinner on Saturday at her mother's house. Suddenly Donna remembers seeing the initials H.M. on her purse. Donna gets in touch with a woman with those initials, but it is not the right person. Donna goes back to the restaurant, but does not get any information there. Donna remembers another name and calls, but it is not the woman. Something happens to make Mary happy to go with Herbie. Herbie says something and Donna realizes who the woman is and that she had the initials upside down. Patti Brill as Hostess. Madge Blake as Woman #1. Gloria Saunders as Woman #2.
78	3	"Donna Decorates"	Andrew McCullough	Seymour Friedman	September 29, 1960
Donna has her kitchen remodeled and new appliances installed. Also, Alex's birthday is coming up, and no one can think of a gift to get him. Donna decides to take Alex's favorite chair to John Coutts (George Ives) to be refinished, thinking that would make a perfect gift. But, now Donna thinks the new chair makes the other living room furniture look drab. Donna wants to redecorate the living room, but she does not think Alex will like the idea. Donna is surprised when Alex actually suggests redecorating. While Donna is preparing to paint the living room, Dennis Mitchell comes by and wants to help. Things do not go well. Donna calls George Wilson and asks him to take Dennis off her hands. George reluctantly agrees. The living room is finally finished. Now Donna does not think the chair fits in the room. George Cisar as Baxter the electrician. Paul Marco as a painter. Note: Jay North and Joseph Kearns reprise their roles from the CBS series "Dennis the Menace" in this episode, which aired on ABC. This marks one of the earliest times in TV history that two scripted series on different networks cooperated on a multi-network crossover, not counting variety shows.
79	4	"The Love Letter"	Robert Ellis Miller	Tom & Helen August	October 6, 1960
The Stones hire handyman Nick Melinas (Jay Novello) to do repairs around the house. Nick, who is Greek, tells Jeff he is going to night school to learn how to read and write in English. Nick asks Jeff to help him write a love letter to his girlfriend Kitty, who is away for a week. Mary finds Jeff's practice letter laying around and shows it to Donna. They now thinks Jeff is in love with a classmate. Donna and Mary run into Donna's friend Jean Brown (Irene Vernon) and find out Jean has a daughter called Katherine. She is in Jeff's class and her nickname is Kitty. Jeff writes another letter for Nick. Donna wants to invite the Brown family over for a barbecue, hoping to help Jeff out. Alex cannot stand the father, Arnold (Maurice Manson), and Mary does not like the son, Danny (Peter Helm). It is the day of the barbecue and things do not go well. Donna feels bad for Jeff. Later, Nick comes by and says he will be married tomorrow. They find out about Kitty and Jeff writing the letters.
80	5	"How the Other Side Lives"	James Sheldon	John Whedon	October 20, 1960
Mary returns home from a weekend visit with her friend Ginny Currier. She just raves about how wonderful her friend's home is. They have a swimming pool and a tennis court. They are clearly quite wealthy. Mr. Currier comes by to drop off Mary's coat. Donna invites Ginny over for the weekend and Mr. Currier says that would be fine. Mary is completely embarrassed by the way the house and her family looks. During the week, Mary tries to make the house more presentable. It is the weekend and Ginny arrives. She talks to Jeff for awhile and he asks her if she wants to play football. Ginny changes into plain clothes and plays with Jeff. Mary comes home and drags Ginny away from Jeff. Mary proceeds to put on airs in front of Ginny. Mary thinks the way Jeff is acting is ruining everything. Donna has to explain to Mary, that while Ginny has everything she wants, there are things that Mary has that Ginny does not. Ginny actually enjoys being around Jeff.
81	6	"Alex's Twin"	Jeffrey Hayden	Nate Monaster	October 27, 1960
Mary meets a boy at school that reminds her of her father. She thinks Elroy Swanson looks like what her father might have looked like at that age. Once they meet, Alex cannot believe Mary sees a resemblance between him and gawky Elroy. Elroy comes over several times. Mary wonders why Alex and Elroy do not seem to have anything to talk about. Elroy really likes Alex and tries to mimic his every move. Alex finds a picture of himself when he was 16. Donna says there is a resemblance in the eyes. Mary is in tears because she thinks Alex was rude to Elroy. Alex shows her the picture and Mary says he looks exactly like Elroy. Alex talks to his friend Jack Richards (Jack Albertson) about Mary. When Alex mentions Elroy, Jack says he knows the family and Elroy does resemble Alex. Alex tries to set up Mary with Dr. Higgins' (C. Lindsay Workman) handsome son Jim (Joseph Gallison). While Jim is very nice, Mary says Elroy is more her type. Jack brings over Miss Graham (Cheerio Meredith), an old school teacher. Even she thinks Elroy looks like a young Alex. It is not until Elroy does something brave, that Alex starts to feel they are alike.
82	7	"Worried Anyone?"	Robert Ellis Miller	Clifford Goldsmith	November 3, 1960
Mary is excited about her date with Scotty Simpson (Jimmy Hawkins). She tells Alex and Donna that Scotty has a car that he built by himself. When Donna learns that parts of the car are from cars that have been in wrecks, she gets worried. Alex tells her everything will be OK. Scotty arrives and seems to be a very nice boy. But, once Alex sees the car and one of its doors falls off, even he gets worried. Alex cannot sleep and every car noise he hears outside worries him. Mary had given Scotty her house key to hold, but now he cannot find it. While Mary is talking to Alex on the phone, Scotty finds the key. Through a misunderstanding, Alex believes Scotty and Mary have been in an accident. Alex calls Mr. Simpson, but Scotty's father thinks Alex is calling about insurance and hangs up. Alex calls several other places but learns nothing. Just then, Mary walks in. When she finds out what Alex thought, Mary becomes quite embarrassed. The next morning, Mary is worried about what Scotty and his family will think about Alex's panicking. Everything winds up being fine between Mary and Scotty.
83	8	"Higher Learning"	Jeffrey Hayden	Hugh Wedlock & Howard Snyder	November 10, 1960
Jeff is disappointed that he is on the second string football team at school. Donna is concerned that Jeff is spending too much time on football and not doing as well as he should in school. Mr. Conroy (Richard Deacon), the principal, asks Donna and Alex to come see him. The school issued an intelligence test to the students, and Jeff got a score that ranks him as a genius. Mr. Conroy believes Jeff should be sent to a special school in Chicago. Donna and Alex are against the idea. It is not long before Donna starts to think Jeff should go. Jeff comes home and says that he just made the first string football team. Alex reluctantly agrees with Donna. They tell Jeff about the school and he does not want to go. They will not force Jeff to go but they strongly recommend it. Jeff tells Donna that he will go. Mr. Conroy tells Donna that Jeff failed the entrance exam for the school. Donna wonders if Jeff did it on purpose. Mr. Conroy says that the whole class was given the test so he could not have known what it was for. Donna and Mr. Conroy find out why Jeff did so poorly. Donna tells Jeff he is not going to the special school. And he is not playing football until his grades improve.
84	9	"Never Marry a Doctor"	Andrew McCullough	John Whedon	November 17, 1960
Jeff is excited about the money he made being a golf caddy. Donna's housekeeper Kathie Dobson comes by and she is exhausted. She was up all night with her baby. Because of an injury, her husband Les (Eddie Firestone) lost his job. Ellen Cruikshank (Maxine Stuart) also comes by and Donna tells her about Kathie. Ellen asks Donna to contribute $20.00 to a charity. Just then Alex gets a call from Les about the baby. Alex, Donna and Kathie rush over. When Les says it might be a while before he can pay his baby's doctor bill, Donna lets him do some work on the house in exchange. Jeff helps Les around the house and Les tells Jeff that money is not everything. The $20.00 that Donna was to give to Ellen suddenly disappears. Ellen implies that Les is unreliable and could have taken it. Jeff does not want to see Les get into trouble so, using his own money, says he found the missing money. Alex tells Les that there is a job as a bank guard for him. Mary may have the answer to what really happened to the $20.00.
85	10	"It Only Hurts When I Laugh"	Jeffrey Hayden	Douglas Morrow	November 24, 1960
Mrs. Adams brings her son Jimmy to see Alex because of an earache. Alex says Jimmy may have to go to the hospital. He tells Jimmy all the nice things about being in a hospital. That night, Alex is getting a pain in his side and thinks it could be his appendix. At the hospital, Alex's friend, Dr. Jim Higgins, tells him the appendix has to come out. Alex gets irritated when it seems that Jim is more interested in his golf game than the surgery. While in the waiting room, Donna strikes up a conversation with another patient named Fred Miller (Carter DeHaven). Jim tells Donna the operation went very well. Donna and the kids visit Alex and try to be uplifting. Fred visits Alex 4 times in one day. Jim tells Alex that Fred's been in the hospital for over a month. Nurse Jane (Helen Kleeb) tells Donna that Alex has been nothing but a grouch. But Jane says that is to be expected when he has been away from his family. Jim tells Alex that every time Fred is to be released, he has a relapse. Donna talks to Fred and finds out he is all alone and bored because he is retired. Donna offers him a job in the hospital gift shop which he gladly excepts.
86	11	"The Model Daughter"	Robert Ellis Miller	Tom & Helen August	December 1, 1960
Mary decides she wants to be a high fashion model. Taffy Cinders is bringing her modeling school to town for a six week course. Alex is worried about the cost, but Donna says there are a limited number of scholarships. Donna is going through the garage looking for things to give to the hospital thrift shop. She finds Alex's old camera which he wants to keep. Mary wins a scholarship to the school, but Alex finds the added costs at every turn expensive. When Mary tells Alex how much it will cost to have pictures taken of her, Alex gets very upset. Alex talks to Taffy and complains about the added costs and that he wants Mary to quit. Taffy sees some of the pictures that Alex took with his camera and says how good they are. She inflates Alex's ego to where Mary can stay in the school and Alex will take the pictures of Mary. Mary tells Donna that she quit the school because she lost interest in modeling. That night, Mary is excited when she learns that she got a job modeling dresses and will get paid for it. Mary tells Donna that she never lost interest, she just did not think Alex's pictures were good enough to submit. Alex tells Donna that to get Mary's confidence back, he arranged the modeling job. Henry Beckman as Hal, Alex's friend.
87	12	"Decisions, Decisions, Decisions"	Jeffrey Hayden	Theodore & Mathilde Ferro	December 8, 1960
Mary has a bad case of indecisiveness and asks Donna for advice on clothes, errands, boys, and more. Two boys asked Mary for a date and she has a hard time choosing. She ends up having a date with Roger and his cousin from New York, Larry. Larry takes them to a Beatnik Club. A young man recites some poetry. He comes by Mary's table and tells her she inspired him. Roger says it is getting late, but Mary decides to stay out. To further show off to Mary, Larry then takes them to an expensive dinner club. Only problem is that Larry does not have any money and keeps borrowing from Roger. Roger and Larry finally admit to Mary that they cannot pay the check. Mary calls home, but Donna and Alex went out for the evening. Mary decides to tell the truth and tells the Headwaiter (Harvey Korman) they do not have the money. He says he understands and she can send the money. Mary gives him her bracelet until they can get the money. The Headwaiter tells the Waiter (Dick Wilson) what a lovely girl Mary is. Mary tells Donna she has come to a decision to always be honest with people. What Mary does not know is that Donna and Alex went to the same dinner club. Donna got Mary's bracelet back.
88	13	"Donna Goes to a Reunion"	Robert Ellis Miller	John Whedon	December 15, 1960
Donna is looking forward to attending her college reunion. Husbands are allowed to go with, but Donna thinks Alex will not have a good time and just make fun of it. Alex decides to go with her. When they arrive, Donna runs into old friend Buffie (Barbara Perry). Alex hears Buffie mention Duke, but neither Buffie nor Donna will says who he is. Alex seems to be getting a little jealous. Donna and Buffie talk about how Hope Ferris (Fay Baker) took Duke away from Donna. Some of the women decide to reenact their cheer-leading cheer and Donna gets a black eye the day of the dance. Donna wants Alex to take her home and they get into an argument. Hope comes by to say hello and mentions how her and Donna were roommates. Hope says something to irritate Donna and Donna decides to go to the dance. At the dance Donna meets Fred (Nesdon Booth), Hope's husband. It turns out Hope did not marry Duke. Alex meets Fred and Donna lets Alex believe that Duke was Fred's nickname. Alex tells Donna he is ashamed that he was actually jealous of Fred. Donna thanks Alex for being jealous. When Alex and Donna get home, Jeff shows them a dog he found. Jeff named the dog Duke.
89	14	"Someone is Watching"	Robert Ellis Miller	John Whedon	December 22, 1960
Jeff mentions to the family that Gordie Pratt (Michael McGreevey) just got a new motor scooter. Jeff hints that he would like one, but Alex says no. Jeff and his friend Eddie are outside and Gordie drives back and forth on his scooter showing off. Jeff says that he wishes Gordie would hit a tree. Just then, Gordie does run into a tree. He pretends his leg is hurt much worse than it is so that he can stay at Jeff's house. Alex cannot find anything really wrong with the boy. Jeff starts to feel guilty. Mrs. Pratt (Betsy Jones-Moreland) comes by and says his father is out of town. Gordie does not want to go home and Alex says he can stay. Donna finds out that Gordie does not get along with his stepmother. The next morning, Donna and Jeff catch Gordie walking around Jeff's room. Gordie confesses to Jeff that he fakes a lot of things in order to receive things he wants from his father. Donna has a talk with Mrs. Pratt and she better understands how she should treat Gordie. Gordie also comes to feel better about his stepmother. Note: This episode was broadcast three days before Christmas but did not feature a Christmas story. Instead at the end the four of them all wished the audience a Merry Christmas, while holding signs for Campbell's Soup and Johnson & Johnson, the show's sponsors.
90	15	"The Lean and Hungry Look"	Robert Ellis Miller	Tom & Helen August	December 29, 1960
Mary and Alex find Donna exercising in the backyard. The dress she bought last season is tight and she is determined to lose weight. Mary mentions to Donna and Alex that she wants Jeff to pay her back from a loan. Alex says the two of them will have to work it out. Alex tells Donna that exercise will not do it alone, she will have to give up all sweets. Donna says that will not a problem. At dinner, Mary brings up Jeff's loan again. She wants to buy a new sweater and needs the money. All Donna can think about is the cake the others are eating for desert. A couple days go by and Donna is still tempted by sweets. She watches as the family eats all they want. Alex gives Donna a hard time about her dieting, that is, until he cannot fit into his dinner jacket. Donna teases Alex a bit when she finds out he has gained weight. Alex decides to play some handball and comes home very sore. Alex and Donna both lose the weight they wanted to. When Mary finally gets her new sweater, she finds she cannot fit into it.
91	16	"Character Building"	Jeffrey Hayden	Clifford Goldsmith	January 5, 1961
Donna writes an editorial for the paper about how parents should make their children follow thru on things. She is surprised when it is actually printed. She wrote it unanimously and asks Alex to not tell anyone it was her. Despite what she asked Alex, Donna tells some of her friends she wrote the article. Donna gets upset with Mary and Jeff starting projects and never finishing them, losing track of items they used last, and more. She decides to make them mend their ways. Jeff's friend Butch (Pat Close) is upset because his father is making him find a tire pump after he read the editorial. Donna's friend Edna (Kristine Miller) tells her that the guest speaker for the PTA meeting had to cancel. After Edna sees Donna's article, she suggests Donna be the speaker. Donna wants Mary to find her jacket before she plays tennis, but Mary plays tennis anyway. When Mary has to go to the dance in an ugly old jacket, Donna wonders if she is going too far with the kids. Donna finds out that she left Mary's jacket at a friends house. Things went well for Mary at the dance and Donna remembers she did not follow thru on something. Danny Sue Nolan as Mildred.
92	17	"World's Greatest Entertainer"	Norman Tokar	Barbara Avedon	January 12, 1961
Jeff seems to be in a slump because lately everything he does goes wrong. Hoping to build him up, the rest of the family starts to praise him for anything he does. Jeff still manages to mess things up and feels bad about it. Donna tells Alex that they have to keep trying to make Jeff feel better. Jeff does some impressions for Alex and Donna, and even though they are not very good, his parents rave about them. Mary is surprised that her parents like the impressions. Jeff then decides to try out for the PTA Talent show with those impressions. Donna goes to see Mrs. Lubner (Connie Sawyer), the woman in charge of the show. Donna is relieved when Mrs. Lubner says she could not put Jeff in the show because they are all full up. After Jeff tells Mrs. Lubner how Donna raved about his impressions, she decides to squeeze him in. Alex tries to talk Jeff into going fishing for the weekend instead of appearing in the show. Thanks to Alex's horrible singing, Donna finds a way to get Jeff to forget about performing in the show.
93	18	"Variations on a Theme"	Jeffrey Hayden	John Whedon	January 19, 1961
Donna is tired of everyone using the piano as a drop area for their belongings. Alex suggests selling it. Piano movers Al (Harvey Lembeck) and Rudy (Johnny Indrisano) come by to pick up the piano. Mary puts up a fight to save it. Al talks Donna and Alex into keeping it and Mary says she will practice everyday. Mary's friend Ginny comes by and they discuss the party Darlene is having soon that they were not invited to. Mary wants to show up Darlene and have a party first and not invite her. Mary wants to get Fuzzy, a neighbor boy, to play the piano at her party. Jeff, who apparently has perfect pitch, tells Mary the piano needs to be tuned. The Piano Tuner (Ludwig Stössel) comes by and it is driving Alex crazy. Mary finally asks Donna if she can have the party. Donna realizes the reason Mary wanted to keep the piano was so Fuzzy could play it. Fuzzy cannot make the party as he is going back to school and the party plans fall apart. Donna suggests they have the party that night. Fuzzy says Darlene changed her party to this evening and he is going to that. Donna finds a way for Mary and Ginny to be invited to Darlene's party.
94	19	"The Stones Go to Hollywood"	Ted Haworth	Phil Sharp	January 26, 1961
Alex tells the family that he is going to Hollywood for a medical conference and has to leave that night. he will only be going for two days. When the family hears that the conference offered to pay for the whole family, they want to go. After they arrive, they hope to squeeze in a lot of sight seeing. Unfortunately it starts to rain and Donna, Mary and Jeff spend most of the day in the hotel. Alex meets Director George Sidney at the conference. The next day, it rains again. Donna and Mary want Alex to ask George if they could all go to his movie set. Alex says he does not know him that well, but calls George anyway. Before Alex can ask, George invites them to the set. George tells them about all the stars that were at his house the night before. Alex had turned down an invite to bring the family there. George asks them if they would like to have a bit part in the movie. Donna has a dream about being a famous movie star, who does not have time for her family. The next day the family has second thoughts about being in the film. Knowing the family was disappointed they did not see any stars, Helen the secretary (Midge Ware) brings by Lassie. Phil Arnold as Assistant Director.
95	20	"Donna Directs a Play"	Robert Ellis Miller	Tom & Helen August	February 2, 1961
Mary and her classmates are rehearsing for a school play. Mary and Tracy are competing for the lead role. Mary tells Donna that they have a real Hollywood and Broadway actor to direct, Gilbert Hardy. Gilbert is in town visiting his sister. Mary winds up getting the lead. Mary learns that Gilbert got called back to Hollywood at the last minute to be in a movie. The class gets together to try and think of who could fill in as director, but they come up with no one. It takes a little doing, but Mary convinces them that Donna would perfect. At first Donna is not so sure she is up for the challenge, but then she accepts. Donna begins to really enjoy her new position. But, then Alex tells Mary he heard that Mr. Hardy will be coming back. Mary is not sure how she will tell Donna. Alex finally tells Donna that Gilbert is coming back and the kids want him. Donna is sad about it, but she puts up a good front and says that it is fine with her. Gilbert says that Donna did such fine job, he would like to have her co-direct with him.
96	21	"Trip to Nowhere"	Robert Ellis Miller	John Whedon	February 9, 1961
Jeff complains to Donna that he has nothing to do. Ricky comes by and Jeff is not happy about. He always brags about his father and it really annoys Jeff. Ricky then brags about going on a camping trip with his father. Jeff would like for Alex to take him camping this weekend. Alex is out of town and calls saying he will not be back until Monday. Donna overhears Jeff lie to Ricky saying he is going camping with Alex. Donna offers to take Jeff camping and Mary would go as well. When Donna mentions the trip, Mary says she had plans with Babs. Donna talks Mary into asking Babs to go along on the trip. Jeff is not happy about camping with three women. Jeff asks his friend Pete to go along. Pete is not interested when he hears who else is going. Seems no one really wants to go. Before the trip, Jeff finds out Ricky did not want to go camping, either. Jeff and Ricky go to the movies.
97	22	"The Geisha Girl"	Norman Tokar	Tom & Helen August	February 16, 1961
Donna is having lunch with Kay (Aline Towne) and Beth (Sally Mansfield). The two complain about how they hardly see their doctor husbands. They also talk about Arthur Stemple (Douglas Dick), the new doctor at the hospital. No one has met his wife yet. Donna goes to meet Chio Stemple (Miyoshi Umeki) and finds that she is Japanese. Knowing the Stemples have traveled around the world, Donna is surprised when Chio tells her this is the biggest town she has ever been in. Donna invites the Stemples, Beth and Ed, and Kay and Ben over for dinner. At dinner, the others are surprised at how Chio caters to her husband. The Stemples invite the others over for dinner the next night. Alex and Donna are at the Stemple's home. Arthur is a little upset, but not surprised, when the two other couples cancel at the last minute. Despite it being late when they get home, Donna calls Beth because she thinks the women do not like Chio. It turns out they do not like the way Arthur has her waiting on him. Donna has lunch with Chio and explains the way Kay and Beth feel. Chio says that Arthur does not expect her to do those things, it is just the way she was raised. Chio tells Donna she would like to learn some American customs and way of life. Arthur loves the new Chio.
98	23	"The Busy People"	James Neilson	Hugh Wedlock & Howard Snyder	February 23, 1961
Donna tells Alex that things are getting stale and they need to get some new interests. Donna's friend Harriet Higgins (Alix Talton) comes by. Harriet tells Donna that her and Jim are taking guitar lessons together. Helen and Fred are taking dance lessons. Harriet says that the husbands are not thrilled about the lessons, but at least they are together. Donna thinks painting lessons could be fun. Donna finds a subtle way for Alex to agree to it. Alex and his doctor friends Fred and Jim complain about the lessons they are taking. Alex has a plan for him and the other men to get out of these lessons. It involves going to the extreme in pretending to enjoy the lessons. Alex is painting a portrait of Donna but will not let anyone see it before it is finished. Jim and Harriet come by and Alex lets Jim look at the painting. Jim says it is very good and Alex should let the ladies look at it. The women are surprised at how bad the painting is. Harriet tells Donna that her and Helen had enough and got their husbands to stop the lessons. Donna is surprised that the men agreed to stop when they supposedly loved the lessons so much. Donna figures out Alex's scheme and decides to turn the tables on him.
99	24	"Tony Martin Visits"	Robert Ellis Miller	Hugh Wedlock & Howard Snyder & Phil Sharp	March 2, 1961
Donna comes home with things she bought for the family ski trip. Donna shows Alex a parking ticket she got and does not think she is in the wrong. Meanwhile, singer Tony Martin is driving with his son, Tony Martin, Jr. (Roger Mobley) through Hilldale. He is stopped by a Cop (Owen Bush) and given a ticket for speeding. Donna decides to fight the ticket in court and tells her side of the story to the Judge Thompson (Herb Vigran). Donna demands a jury trial. Tony is in the court as well. He decides to fight his ticket because Donna is fighting hers and also wants a trial. Donna tells the family she met Tony Martin and that she will have a jury trial. The family is upset with Donna as the court date will interfere with the ski trip. Donna invited Tony and his son over for dinner. Donna decides to tell Tony she is not going to fight the ticket. When Tony arrives, he finds out about the ski trip and thinks Donna should just pay the fine. Judge Thompson comes by with his daughter, who is not feeling well, hoping Alex could take a look at her. Thompson sees Donna and Tony. Alex recommends the daughter spend the night. Tony sings Wrap Your Troubles in Dreams to help her sleep. Donna and Tony do go to court. Tony wins, but Donna winds up losing.
100	25	"Aunt Belle's Earrings"	Robert Ellis Miller	Henry Sharp	March 9, 1961
Donna wants to go to the Founders Ball but Alex does not. Alex is struggling with Oliver Greevy (Will Wright) about the price of some land for a new clinic. Donna gets a call from Aunt Belle, who is at the train station just passing through. Alex insists that she stay for a couple days. Mary thinks she came back to town because of an old romance. Belle tells Donna she was seeing a man named Oliver back then. They broke up back then over an argument about going to the Founders Ball. Greevy comes by Alex's office and they have a heated exchange. Greevy runs into Belle. Turns out he is her Oliver. They find out that neither one is married. Donna and Alex find out that Belle is going out with Oliver Greevy. They see each other a couple more times and Alex is not thrilled about it. Because of something Alex says, they once again stop seeing each other. Belle would like Donna to return a pair of earrings to Oliver. Alex learns that Oliver will sell the land for the price Alex wanted. With the help of Belle's earrings, Donna gets Oliver to propose to Belle and he will take her to the ball. Alex agrees to go to the ball as well.
101	26	"Poodle Parlor"	Jeffrey Hayden	John Whedon	March 16, 1961
Alex asks Donna to write out a check for the plumber. After she does, he points out that she has already paid him twice. Madeline (Florence MacMichael) and Jack Richards (Jack Albertson) come by to play Bridge. They bring with a poodle that was a present from Jack. Madeline mentions how she would like to open a poodle parlor in town. The men laugh at the idea and the women go upstairs. Later that night, Alex tells Donna that he thinks women do not know anything about running a business. At lunch, Donna and Madeline decide they want to go into the poodle business together. But then they cannot decide what to eat. Donna thinks they should get some advice and suggests George Heiser (Frank Wilcox), the bank manager. Heiser is very blunt about how hard it is to start a business and how many failures there are. The women are determined, but then find out there are only seven poodles in town. Donna and Madeline come up with a way for their husbands to talk them out of their idea, so they do not have to tell them it would fail.
102	27	"Mary's Heart Throb"	Norman Tokar	John Whedon	March 23, 1961
Mary tells Donna that her friend Darlene arranged for her to babysit at the Damons' (Wilton Graff and Sara Seegar) that night. Herbie comes by and tells Mary that he has two tickets to the ballet. But because Mary is babysitting, he asked Darlene. Mary realizes that Darlene set the whole thing up. While babysitting, Mary is watching a scary movie on TV. She gets frightened when someone comes in the front door. It turns out to be older brother Rick. He tells Mary he left college. Rick says that he does not want his father deciding his future. Plus, he was turned down by the fraternity that his father wanted him to join and he is afraid to face his father. Herbie comes by and tells Mary he had a fight with Darlene. Herbie wants to know what she is doing with Rick. The Damon's come home and Rick hides. Mary does not tell them Rick is home. On the way home, Mary and Herbie have a fight. Rick comes by and Donna offers to let him stay the night. Herbie comes back to apologize to Mary and gets upset when he sees Rick. Mr. Damon comes by and Donna helps him to see how Rick feels.
103	28	"Donna's Helping Hand"	Norman Tokar	John Whedon	March 30, 1961
Alex has had a long day of house calls. He did not even have time for dinner. The next day Donna's friend Myra Keppler (Frances Robinson) comes by. Donna complains about Alex's crazy schedule. Myra mentions that Dr. Steinhaus (Vladimir Sokoloff), the Board of Health Director, is to retire. She suggests that Donna should campaign to have Alex nominated. It would mean he could have regular office hours. Dr. Steinhaus tells Alex he would really like it if Alex took over his position. Alex says that he really likes his practice. Dr. Steinhaus does make a compelling argument for taking the job. Alex says he will think about it. Donna tries to talk Alex into taking the job. Just when Donna says Alex could have more quiet time at home, Jeff and Mary get into a loud fight. Donna asks Alex to show up to a reception for a benefit that was thrown. While there, Alex is talking to Dr. Steinhaus. Dr. Flanigan (Robert Shayne), who is also in the running for Steinhaus' job, is there. Something Steinhaus tells Alex convinces Alex to stay at his job. Steinhaus is actually happy with Alex's decision. Stuart Nisbet as Reporter.
104	29	"The Merry Month of April"	Robert Ellis Miller	John Whedon	April 6, 1961
Alex reprimands Jeff for waiting until the last minute to do his homework. Alex realizes it is the day before income taxes are due, and he rushes to prepare the papers. Donna says Alex should go to Harvey Parker (Francis DeSales) the accountant, but Alex refuses. Donna does not understand why Alex said no as they have used Harvey before. Donna is watching a Judge on a TV show (Franklin Parker). She then envisions herself on the witness stand and Alex is the Judge. Nora (Ruth Storey), Harvey's wife, comes by. Donna tells Nora that she knew Alex was too busy, so she gave Harvey their tax papers days ago. Nora goes with Donna to get the papers back so Alex can do them. Nora drags Donna to a hat store before they go to see Harvey. Donna calls Alex and he claims he finished the returns without the files he wanted. Dr. Brady (C. Lindsay Workman) tells Alex that he had someone else do his taxes. Donna tells Alex about some expensive things that went wrong in the house. Harvey and Nora come by. Because of several mistakes Alex made, it is a good thing that Harvey did the returns. Alex will now get a large refund. Hanna Landy as Sales Girl.
105	30	"Music Hath Charms"	Norman Tokar	John Whedon	April 13, 1961
Donna buys a musical tobacco jar for Alex. The jar plays "Melancholy Baby" which Donna thinks is their song. Alex really hates that song. Dr. Jim Higgins (C. Lindsay Workman) comes by and Donna wants Alex to show him the jar. Alex tells Jim how he came about to hate the song. Later, Donna reminisces about their honeymoon and how they heard that song. Donna gets a little upset with Alex when he stops the song from playing. The next day the two make up. While putting on a puppet show for some local children, Jeff accidentally damages the jar. Jeff lets Alex know what happened. Jeff thinks he will be able to fix it and they decide to not tell Donna just yet. Jeff tells Mary and Mary says she will not tell Donna, but she does. Donna buys another one to replace it. Not knowing that Donna knows about the broken jar, Alex also goes out and buys one. Then, to top it off, Jeff manages to fix the original one. Peter Oliphant as Pete. Trudy Marshall as Mother.
106	31	"Let's Look at Love"	Jeffrey Hayden	Clifford Goldsmith	April 20, 1961
Mary is upset when she learns that Roger and Elroy tossed a coin to see who would take her out. Mary does not want to be considered a pawn and decides to give up on boys. Meanwhile, Alex shows Donna a medical magazine that he is mentioned in. Roger calls to try and explain but Mary will not talk to him. Elroy drops off some groceries and would like to see Mary. Alex is trying to read the article and keeps getting disturbed. Mary tells Donna about all the famous women in history. A boy named Stanley comes over and offers to cut the grass. Alex finds out that Stanley knows Mary. Alex goes to his office to read, but still gets disturbed there. Mary tells Alex that she wants to devote her life to science. Jeff interrupts Alex's reading by making noise with his punching bag. Stanley is very methodical and scientific. Donna thinks there is something wrong with him and tells Alex. Mary finds out Stanley is interested in science as well. Mary wants to spend more time with Stanley. She also manages to turn the tables on Roger.
107	32	"For Better or Worse"	Norman Tokar	Story by : Nate Monaster; Teleplay by : Phil Sharp & David R. Schwartz	April 27, 1961
Alex and his friends Jim, Joe and Ed are planning a fishing trip. Jim and Ed say they have to ask permission from their wives to go. Alex and Joe say they do not not have to ask for permission. Meanwhile, Mary is having a hard time picking a subject for a paper she has to write. Alex tells Donna about the fishing trip and how two of the guys had to ask their wives. Donna asks him why he did not ask her. Donna is clearly not happy about it. Mary starts writing about which parent is the most dominant. Joe is talking to his wife Myra (Frances Robinson) about the trip and she is not happy about it either. Joe and Alex have a hard time telling each other about their wives reaction to the trip. Alex finally tells Joe he is not going. Joe admits that Myra did not want him to go, but he says he has a way to make her give in. Donna runs into Myra at the grocery store. Myra is wearing a new coat that Joe bought her so he could go fishing. Alex tells Joe that he does not believe in bribery. Donna tells Myra that Alex is man enough to not stoop to bribery. Donna is upset and disappointed when Alex brings something home for her. But she is happy when it turns out to be rubber gloves that she asked for weeks ago.
108	33	"Jeff, the Treasurer"	Jeffrey Hayden	John Elliotte	May 4, 1961
Jeff is elected class treasurer and brings home all the money in the class fund. Alex and Donna warn him to be careful. The roll of money winds up in a pot of boiling water. Jeff then uses a hair dryer and an iron to dry the money. Jeff brings the money to school. Some of the guys think he will lose the money before the class picnic. While putting things away in his locker, the money accidentally falls into one of Jeff's gym shoes. Back at home, Jeff realizes that the money is not in his pocket. Jeff tries to subtly look around the house for the money. Amy, the assistant treasurer, comes by the house with more money. Jeff admits to her that he does not know where the money is. Donna and Alex figure out that Jeff lost the money. Jeff goes to school early to look around there. Mr. Perkins (Doodles Weaver), the school janitor, asks him what he is looking for. Jeff says it is personal. Miss Haskell asks Jeff for the money because she wants to book the bus for the picnic. When Miss Haskell comes by the house to pick up the funds, Alex fronts the money. Jeff thanks Alex and is sorry he did not come to him sooner. Right before leaving for the picnic Jeff finds the money and is able to pay Alex back.
109	34	"The Good Guys and the Bad Guys"	Robert Ellis Miller	John Whedon	May 11, 1961
Donna & Alex are encouraging Jeff to join the church choir. He said he would, but then he changes his mind. Meanwhile in school, Jeff sticks up for Lenny (Stephen Talbot) when he is teased for being in the choir. Jeff is then teased by Jocko and some of the other boys. Back at home, the family can tell that something is bothering Jeff. Jeff takes up weight lifting to muscle up in case of a fight. Choir director Mr. Trestle (Leonard Stone) talks to Jeff because he thinks Jeff is being teased. Lenny keeps telling Jocko and the guys that Jeff is not afraid of them. Jeff tells Lenny to stop doing that because he is not ready yet. Jocko calls Jeff a chicken. Jeff grabs him and Jocko backs off. A fight is set up between Jeff and Jocko for that evening. After dinner, Lenny comes by to pick up Jeff. Lenny claims they are going to choir practice. Lenny tells Jeff he let it slip to Mr. Trestle about the fight. Jeff finds Jocko and neither wants to start the fight. Mr. Trestle comes by and says it takes more courage to be in the choir. All the boys join, even Jocko. Bobby Clark as Gordie.
110	35	"Military School"	Robert Ellis Miller	Henry Sharp	May 18, 1961
Herbie is over and his clumsiness is driving Alex crazy. Later, Mary is upset because Herbie has a friend coming to visit. Herbie invited this friend to go along with Mary and him to the school dance. Herbie tells Donna about his friend Ken Carslake (Chris Robinson), who is a cadet in the military. He knows Mary is upset that he asked Ken to the dance. Donna says that maybe Mary can find a date for Ken. Mary says she will not get a date for Ken and she is not going to the dance. When Ken comes by and Mary sees how handsome he is, she changes her mind. Herbie gets disappointed when he sees all the attention Mary is paying to Ken. Following Donna's suggestion, Herbie tries to set Ken up with Claudette (Adrienne Ellis). After Ken sees Claudette, he wants nothing to do with her. Herbie then feels he has to ask Claudette to the dance. While trying to water Donna's flower bed, Herbie manages to soak himself, Mary and Ken. Ken says something about Herbie that upsets Mary. Herbie confides in Donna that Claudette turned him down. Mary tells Donna she is not going to the dance. Donna tells her about Claudette. In the end, Mary and Herbie wind up going to the dance together. Herbie joins the cadets for their summer session.
111	36	"Mary's Driving Lesson"	Robert Ellis Miller	Tom & Helen August	May 25, 1961
Donna's friend Joyce (Sally Mansfield) comes by because the two were going shopping. That will have to be cut short because Mary asks Donna to pick her up after school. Donna asks Mary if she would like to learn how to drive. It turns out Mary was able to get a ride from Scotty. Mary asks Scotty to teach her how to drive. Donna and Alex think Mary should just go to a driving school, because when Alex tried to teach Donna, they would just get into fights. They get into a disagreement when they recall those times. Mary still wants Scotty to teach her. He starts out by telling her all about how cars work. Jeff comes by and interrupts things. Mary just wants to learn how to drive. Scotty tries to demonstrate how an engine works by riding a bicycle. He rides into a tree and hurts himself. Later when Mary stops suddenly at a sign, Scotty hits his head on the mirror. Scotty asks Alex if they could use his car. After Mary bumps into another car, her and Scotty get into a fight. They each walk away leaving Alex's car in the street. Mary winds up going to driving school and her and Scotty make up.
112	37	"The Mustache"	Jeffrey Hayden	Phil Sharp	June 1, 1961
Alex has been gone for a week on a hunting trip. Mary tells Donna about Frank, a boy at school, who is a deep thinker. Jeff comes home all disheveled and Donna reprimands him. Just then Alex returns from the trip with a mustache and beard. Alex says that they did not get one duck. Donna tells Alex about the dinner party at the Henderson's, that he hoped he missed, had been changed to this Monday. Alex hates those parties at the Henderson's. Paul the Barber (Doodles Weaver) talks Alex into keeping the mustache. Mary asks Donna if she could wear glasses to give her a more serious look. The mustache receives mixed reviews from the family. Donna, especially, is not fond of it. She wants him to shave it off, but he will not. Mary continues to want to be more deep like Frank. Mary gets upset when Frank takes another girl to the movies. Alex and Donna get into a fight when they start being honest about things with each other. They do come to an understanding. Before they go to the dinner party, Alex shaves off the mustache.
113	38	"Mary's Little Lambs"	Jeffrey Hayden	Tom & Helen August	June 8, 1961
Donna is going out of town, but it takes her a while to leave the house. Mary's friend Mark manages to talk Alex into having a teen party that night after the dance. Mark needs some money to paint his car. Mary and Mark come up with the idea to run a baby-sitting service. After the dance, Alex is very busy cooking food for all the kids that showed up. Jeff has his hands full pouring drinks. Mark mentions the baby sitting to Alex, who thinks it would be a good idea. The next morning, Alex is looking forward to sleeping late. Mark comes by and surprises Mary by saying they will run the baby-sitting service at her house. He says he told all the mothers there would be a pediatrician on site. The children start showing up and they wake up Alex. The backyard is full of children and things for them to play with. Alex winds up having to treat some of the children. After the day is over, there is one child left that has not been picked up. He says his name is Johnnie (Peter Oliphant), but he does not know his last name. Alex has to figure out who he belongs to. It turns out he belongs to a new family on the block and he just wandered off. Alex tells Mark to run his service in the public park. Alex and Jeff try to clean the house before Donna shows up. Karyn Kupcinet as Jeannie, a friend. Bobby Buntrock as crying child.

=== Season 4 (1961–62) ===
No. overall	No. in season	Title	Directed by	Written by	Original release date
114	1	"One Starry Night"	Jeffrey Hayden	Sumner Long	September 14, 1961
Kip Dennis (James Darren), a young pop singer, is driving down the road with his friend Johnny. Kip mentions he will be joining the Army soon. Johnny has to catch a flight. Kip in now driving through town by himself. Mary backs out of her driveway and Kip runs into her. Kip tells her she backed out without looking and it was her fault. Mary does not know who he is, as he introduced himself as Jim Bryce. Mary has Jim meet the family. Jeff thinks he is seen Jim before, but Jim says this is his first time in Hilldale. Jim lies and says the accident was his fault and he will pay for the damage. Jim stays for dinner. Mary and Jim have a date for the next evening. Jeff still thinks he knows Jim. Mary admits to Alex the accident was her fault. After Jim and Mary leave for their date, Jeff discovers who Jim really is. After dinner, Jim and Mary park and he sings to her. Later, Mary finds out about Kip from the family. She is upset because of the way she threw herself at him. Kip is leaving for the Army the next day. Donna tells Mary to just enjoy the happy memory. The next day, Jim comes by to say goodbye and Mary wishes him well. Note: James Darren had previously appeared on the show playing another pop star. This episode started a small trend on the show, where a new song was introduced by the record label owned by the studio. In this case "Goodbye Cruel World" was introduced and it helped the song reach #3 in the charts, which would be the biggest hit of Darren's career.
115	2	"A Rose is a Rose"	Robert Ellis Miller	Clifford Goldsmith	September 21, 1961
Donna tells Alex about what happened at the PTA meeting and how embarrassed she was. Miss Nelson, Jeff's English teacher, read Jeff's paper that was filled with terrible grammar. They confront Jeff about it. He is told to rewrite the paper. Jeff reminds them that today is the father / son baseball game. Alex says he will have plenty of time to practice after he has finished. Spike comes by to see if Jeff is ready to practice. Jeff is having a hard time with the paper. Donna tells him they very much want him to play in the game, but he has to write the paper. Joe Smith (John Zaremba), another father who is playing in the game, has Alex look at his wrist. Joe mentions to Donna and Alex how important it is for the fathers to bond with their sons at the game. Jeff finishes the paper, but Alex and Donna quickly realize that Mary helped. Thinking he might be sent to a boarding school, Jeff rewrites the paper and does a much better job. Jeff and Alex head off to the game. Alex gets pretty banged up while playing.
116	3	"The Close Shave"	Norman Tokar	Sumner Long	September 28, 1961
Jeff has discovered he is growing whiskers and is excited to show the family. He starts acting more mature. He wears a suit to school. Jeff calls his parents Mother and Father instead of Mom and Dad. He goes out and buys some shaving supplies. The family watches as Jeff makes his first attempt at shaving. Donna tells Alex she feels old now. Alex tells Donna that Jeff is just going through a phase. Jeff tells Donna and Alex that he got a job at Mr. Pearson's (Hal Smith) drugstore. He even got his own social security card. Jeff wants to pay his share of the household expenses. Mr. Pearson gives Jeff a long list of things to do around the store. That night, Jeff dreams about all the work he did that day. Jeff comes home with his first pay envelope. Instead of the $18 he was expecting, he only got $9.45. He learns about taxes and deductions. Jeff has a heart to heart talk with Alex. Jeff realizes that he is not quite ready for manhood just yet.
117	4	"Mouse at Play"	Jeffrey Hayden	John Whedon	October 5, 1961
Donna is about to leave the house when her friend Iris Keppler (Cloris Leachman) comes by. She says that her mother came for a visit. Suddenly her husband Jack has a business trip and leaves. Then Iris tells Donna about an article she read that stated it is the wife's responsibility to keep the marriage interesting. Iris is upset because Jack never notices anything new. Donna realizes Alex can also sometimes be unobservant. Later, Alex does not notice a new dress Donna's wearing. He tells her he decided to go to a medical convention. Alex leaves for his trip. Iris comes by and shows Donna that she changed the color of her hair. Iris tries to talk Donna into changing her hair. Mary points out a gray hair on Donna. Donna goes to see Eric the hair stylist (John Astin). Donna shows Mary her new hair color. Iris comes by saying Jack did not like her hair. Just then, Alex comes home. Donna is afraid to show him her hair. She has Iris distract Alex, so she can sneak out and change her hair back. While talking to Donna, Alex mentions how good Iris looks and would Donna consider coloring her hair. Iris tells Donna that Jack now likes her hair.
118	5	"The Monster"	Jeffrey Hayden	John Whedon	October 12, 1961
Alex will be taking a flight out of town that evening. Donna, Jeff and Mary discover mysterious animal prints in the backyard. They show them to Alex and he says it is nothing to be afraid of. That night, Alex leaves for the airport. Jeff mentions monsters and is watching a scary movie on TV. Mary has a bad dream that wakes Donna up. Donna then hears someone trying to open the front door and she wakes up Jeff. Mary then wakes up and they head downstairs. It turns out to be a very large furry dog and they take it in. Donna believes it must belong to someone. She calls the police to see if anyone reported a missing dog. Just then a storm starts up. They try going back to sleep and the phone rings. Donna picks up the phone and there is no one there. They again hear someone trying to get in the front door. They see a shadow of a man at the door. Donna tries to call the police again, but the phone is dead. Turns out to be Alex, his flight was canceled due to the storm. They hear a noise and Alex sees someone in the front yard. A Mr. Carlson (Bert Remsen) is looking for his dog. He sees how much Jeff likes the dog. He hopes the Stones will keep him, which they do.
119	6	"New Girl in Town"	Jeffrey Hayden	Michael Fessier	October 19, 1961
Jeff asks Alex to buy him a camera, but Alex says no. Mary takes Jeff's side and he wants to know why. Mary offers to pay Jeff's way to a movie if he takes Angie Quinn (Candy Moore), a new girl in the neighborhood, to the movie with him. Mary's real interest is in Bill (Johnny Washbrook), Angie's brother. Jeff reluctantly agrees. Bill and Angie come by the house. Despite Angie's initial attitude that boys do not like her, Jeff actually does. Instead of going to the movies, they go to a baseball game. Jeff and Angie spend a lot of time together, mostly playing sports. Daniel (Walter Brooke), Angie's father, comes over for a talk. He would like Jeff to see less of her, as she is tomboy enough. Daniel would like her to spend more time with girls her age. All Angie ever wears are blue jeans and a sweatshirt. Daniel asks Donna for her help. Donna gets Angie to dress like a girl. Jeff and Angie are going to a party. Jeff is pleasantly surprised when he sees her in a dress. Jeff comes home early. He tells Alex and Donna that Angie danced and did other things with all the other boys. Jeff is heartbroken. Feeling bad, Angie comes to see Jeff and apologize. Not knowing that Jeff and Angie are friends again, Alex buys the camera for Jeff to make him feel better.
120	7	"One of Those Days"	Jeffrey Hayden	John Whedon	October 26, 1961
Alex is very upset because things are falling apart around the house. The kitchen faucet is dripping. Alex is tired of his daily routine. Donna convinces him that they should go on a picnic to relax. They are driving out in the country and the car runs out of gas. They decide to walk to find a phone or a gas station. Donna finds some violets to pick. Alex thinks it is going to rain, but Donna tells him it does not matter. Meanwhile, the kids come home and no ones there. Mary finds a note saying they went on a picnic. Mary wonders if Alex and Donna ever get tired of her and Jeff. Alex and Donna walk to the secluded house of an old man (Arthur Hunnicutt) and his wife. The old man says he has a can of gas in his car, but his wife is using the car. He says she should be back soon. They have a nice conversation. Ma comes back and drives them to their car. They then go to a lake that Alex went to as a child and talk to a little boy fishing there. It brings back fond memories for Alex. After returning home, where their children happily greet them, Alex realizes things are not all that bad.
121	8	"All is Forgiven"	Andrew McCullough	John Whedon	November 2, 1961
Donna & Alex have dinner at their friends Millie (Patricia Barry) & Ed (William Windom) Corwin's house. From the beginning, Millie and Ed are bickering with each other. The next morning, Millie comes over and complains about Ed. Ed tells Alex that he is going to pack his bag and leave. Donna and Alex are concerned about their friends. Donna says they would bond more if they had children. Alex mentions a baby at the hospital that is up for adoption. The parents married too young and the father does not have a job. Donna thinks the Corwins should adopt the baby, but Alex is not so sure. Without knowing the other is coming, Donna invites the Corwins over for dinner. Millie arrives first and sees the baby. Ed comes by and he and Millie are both enjoying the baby. Mrs. Stedman (Nancy McCarthy), the young mother, comes over to see the baby. She tearfully explains why she cannot keep the baby. Ed tells her he will find a job for her husband and she is so happy and thankful. That kind gesture makes Millie want to get back with Ed.
122	9	"The Electrical Storm"	Barry Shear	Andy White	November 9, 1961
Jeff is about to go to school. His friends Walter the Wizard (Lee Aaker) and Smitty (Darryl Richard) come by. Walter fixes a toaster for Donna and they leave. Jeff is expelled from school when he and his two friends pull a prank that causes the school bell to constantly go off. Jeff will not tell Mr. Heflin (Richard Deacon), the principal, who the other boys were. Heflin calls Donna to let her know. Jeff comes home, but before Alex can say anything to him, he sneaks out the window. Donna suspects something's wrong but wants to wait until Jeff is ready to come to them. A day goes by with Jeff pretending to go school. Alex finds out that Jeff has been spending the day at the reservoir. Tired of waiting, Alex has a family meeting that finally starts to get some answers. Walter comes by and says that he confessed to Mr. Heflin that he was behind the whole thing. Walter then unscrambled the bell. Anne Sargent as Miss Tucker, a teacher.
123	10	"The Paper Tycoon"	Jeffrey Hayden	Sheila J. Lynch	November 16, 1961
Jeff has a paper route and realizes it is not as easy as it seems. Donna asks him why he does not get someone to help him. Jeff decides to hire some other kids to do the work and he would just sit back and collect the money. Jeff tells Alex that he bought two additional paper routes and will hire three kids to deliver them. He wants to borrow $20, but Alex says they will talk about it later. Jeff needs the money by that evening and he manages to get it from Donna. Alex is not happy that Donna did it, but they will see if Jeff can do things right. Jeff hires Bill, Timmy and Craig. Donna thinks Timmy might be a little young, but Jeff is not concerned. At first things go well, but then the complaints and problems start to happen. Jeff winds up doing a lot more work than he envisioned. Alex tells Jeff that Mr. Johnson, from the newspaper, called him. He said if the complaints continue, he will take two of the routes away. Jeff is disappointed because, after he paid the boys, there was no money left for him. His homework is starting to suffer. Jeff is going to be kicked off the team because he has missed too many practices. Jeff comes to understand that one cannot get something for nothing.
124	11	"Private Tutor"	Earl Bellamy	Frank Fox	November 23, 1961
Mary is excited about the Hilldale Centennial Dance party coming up next week. It will be formal. Mary hopes Joel, the new boy in school, will invite her. Donna says she cannot go until her grades in French class improve. Donna hires a tutor for Mary and it turns out to be Joel. Joel comes by and mentions that he just moved here from Canada. Mary gives Joel a not to subtle hint about the dance. Jeff complains to Donna about all the work he has to do around the house. Joel asks Donna if there are any other jobs he can do. Mary is upset that Joel seems more interested in work than her. After something Alex says, Jeff decides to compete with Joel for the extra money. Mary drops another hint about the dance, but Joel goes to Alex and asks about more jobs. Joel and Jeff keep competing for jobs and low bidding each other. Mary finds out Joel was doing all this work so he can afford to take her to the dance. The night of the dance, Alex thanks Joel for getting Jeff to learn about hard work. Jeff tells Alex that because Joel will not be working around the house anymore, his prices will be going up.
125	12	"Alex, the Professor"	Jeffrey Hayden	Barbara Hammer	November 30, 1961
Donna's friend Alma (Dorothy Lovett) wants her to find someone to give a lecture for their women's group class. That night, Alex is upset because Mary is out late. When Mary comes home, she says she is not a child. Alex says something that Donna thinks is quite profound. The next morning Donna asks Alex about the class, but he refuses. Alex tells Jim (C. Lindsay Workman) that Donna will inform his wife, Alma, that he is not interested. Somehow, Alma talks Alex into being the speaker and talking about child psychology. Alex starts doing research for his speech. He puts his theories into practice with Mary and Jeff. Donna is not thrilled. The next time Mary comes home late, Alex does not get upset. Alex gives the speech and the audience very impressed. After awhile, all his theories start to backfire on him and he tells his class about it. Alex decides to let the kids conduct the class.
126	13	"The Fabulous O'Hara"	Barry Shear	Douglas Morrow	December 7, 1961
Jeff comes up with an idea on how to make money. He could be Alex's agent and steer school kids to his practice. Alex's patient Butch O'Hara (Ricky Kelman) lives with his grandfather, Algernon O'Hara (Cecil Kellaway). Alex learns that Jeff referred Algernon to him. After a follow up visit, Algernon thinks Alex is undercharging and says he should charge more for his services. But, instead of Algernon paying the higher fee, he tries to give Alex a tip on the horse races. Surprisingly, the horses he picks, usually win and Alex becomes very interested. Donna asks Algernon if he thinks he can make a living betting on the horses. Donna hears from Butch that he moves from town to town and they never really have much money. Butch spends the night and Donna has a nice talk with him. The next day the horse that Algernon had bet everything on loses. Donna confronts Algernon and says she is worried about how Butch is being raised. Later, Donna feels bad about the way she talked to Algernon. Algernon decides to settle in town and gets a real job working with horses.
127	14	"Way of a Woman"	Norman Tokar	John Whedon	December 14, 1961
Babs and Dorine are trying to talk Mary into going on weekend skiing trip. Mary tries to charm Alex into letting her go on the trip. But it is Donna that says it is alright. Donna's even happy that Mary will be going with Scotty. Alex is still against the idea. Scotty comes by and Mary shows him the new ski outfit she bought. Scotty tells Mary that he cannot go on the trip. Donna sees Mary's disappointment and asks Alex to take her on a trip to Chicago to make up for it. Mary is thrilled. Alex makes special arrangements for the trip and is starting to look forward to it. They will be leaving soon. Scotty comes by and tells Mary the real reason he could not go was because he did not have any money. Mary says she is glad that he was honest with her. Scotty asks her if she would like to do something else with him. Mary asks Donna how she can get out of the Chicago trip without hurting Alex's feelings. Mary is honest with Alex and he is a little upset. Donna tells Alex she will go in Mary's place and he is happy.
128	15	"A Very Bright Boy"	Jackie Cooper	True Boardman	December 21, 1961
Victor (Johnny Crawford), the son of Donna's college roommate Marcia (Rosemary LaPlanche), is going to spend a week with the Stones. Jeff wonders what he is going to do with a thirteen year old. Donna says that Victor's father died four years ago and he has spent most of his time in boarding school. Marcia just remarried and is away on her honeymoon. Due to his mother's poor handwriting, they expect him to have a below average IQ. Victor, who in fact is a genius, is riding with Professor Warren (John Warburton). They arrive at the Stone house. The family quickly realize that Victor is far from unintelligent. Donna invites Professor Warren and his wife to dinner the next night. Victor's ramblings soon bore the family. Alex has a talk with Victor about family helping each other. The next day, the family is going to the lake for the afternoon, but Victor wants to stay home. When they get home, they find Victor has done Mary and Jeff's homework and he wrote a paper for Alex. Victor overhears them say how no one would believe they wrote these things. Feeling bad that he just does not fit in, Victor runs away. After Alex and Donna find him, Donna has a long talk with him. Victor takes Donna's advice and he feels much better. Marcia and her husband Joe come to pick him up. Victor makes a great effort to get along with Joe.
129	16	"The Toughest Kid in School"	Norman Tokar	Henry Sharp	December 28, 1961
Sheldon (Kirk Alyn) and Lavinia Crawford come by with their son Barlow. As they are new in the neighborhood, they would like Barlow to meet Jeff. Jeff does not want to meet Barlow, so he hides. Donna wants Jeff to help Barlow get acquainted with school and friends. Alex bribes Jeff into doing it. Jeff gives Barlow the nickname Bucky and tries to talk him up to the other guys. Barlow tells the other boys that he was expelled from his last school, but he really was not. Some of the guys think Barlow is making it up. Trying to prove that he is cool, Barlow pretends to steal some food from a bakery. But, without the other boys seeing, he actually paid for the food. Jeff is feeling guilty and worried about what Barlow did. Donna senses something is wrong. The next day Mrs. Pruitt comes by. She tells Donna she saw Barlow take food from the bakery and Jeff was there. Donna goes to see Mr. Walgren (Jess Kirkpatrick) at the bakery and offers to pay for the eclairs. Walgren tells her Barlow paid for them. Jeff confesses to Donna and Alex about what happened and that he tried to pay for the eclairs. Donna tells Jeff what Barlow really did. Jeff tells Barlow that he does not need to pretend to be tough. Jeff says the other boys will except him as he is.
130	17	"Dr. Stone and His Horseless Carriage"	Norman Tokar	Sumner Long	January 11, 1962
Donna sees in the newspaper that Dr. Thorgesen, from the Chicago Clinic, will be coming to town on his lecture tour. Alex is interested in seeing him. Alex is excited over his new car, an antique 1910 Flanders car. The family is surprised to see how beat up it is. He spends a lot of time restoring the car. People around town are making jokes about the car and Alex. The family tell Alex some of the jokes and he is not amused. Mr. Webley (Gale Gordon), the Administrator of the Hospital, tells Alex that fooling around with the dirty car is not becoming of a doctor. Because of something that Donna says, Alex decides to drive the car to the lecture by Dr. Thorgesen. On the way, one of the front wheels falls off and Alex causes a major traffic jam. The next day, the story makes the newspaper. Mr. Webley comes by and asks Alex what he is supposed to say to the hospital board. Just then Dr. Thorgesen arrives at the house. Webley is surprised to learn that Thorgesen is also interested in antique cars. Thorgesen says he owns three of them. Alex tells Donna that Thorgesen's Antique Auto Club will honor him by finishing their annual tour here in town. It is the day of the tour and the parade of antique cars has started. Thorgesen is the moderator and when it is time to announce Alex's car, it is not there. Turns out Alex ran out of gas.
131	18	"For Angie with Love"	Norman Tokar	Barbara Hammer	January 18, 1962
Jeff has a crush on Angie (Candy Moore). He jokes about her never finding her keys when he walks her home. Mary is talking to Donna about Jeff chasing after Angie. Jeff makes a key ring for Angie's birthday present. Jeff feels he is competing for Angie with a rich boy named Roger Devlin. He would like to get her something else in addition to the key ring. Smitty (Darryl Richard) catches Jeff in front of a woman's clothing store. Mrs. Foster (Trudy Marshall), the owner, tries to help Jeff pick something out. Unfortunately, they are out of Jeff's price range. Mrs. Devlin (Mary Lawrence), Roger's mother, comes in the store. She is picking up a Cashmere sweater that Roger is going to give Angie. Jeff then charges a silk blouse. To raise the money, Jeff sells some of his possessions to Smitty. Donna makes Jeff give the money back. Jeff has a dream where he is a teenage idol and is rich. Roger is his chauffeur. Later, Jeff tells Donna that he charged the blouse and that is why he needed the money. After something Donna says, Jeff realizes it is not how much a gift costs that is important. Jeff returns the blouse. Note: Paul Peterson sings "She Can't Find Her Keys". This song became a billboard hit for Paul.
132	19	"Aloha Kimi"	Norman Tokar	Paul West	January 25, 1962
Penny (Susan Gordon), the daughter of family friend Janet Palmer (Betsy Jones-Moreland), is paralyzed in a surfing accident. Alex is asked to fly to Hawaii to assist in her treatment. Alex tells Donna he wants her to go with. At the Pacific View Clinic, Dr. Kendall (Crahan Denton) and Alex believe Penny's problem could be hysterical paralysis. She had lost her father several months earlier. He was a Navy flyer. Alex then meets Dr. Paul Phillips (James Douglas) and Kimi Makihara (Miyoshi Umeki), the Head Nurse. Kimi takes Alex to see Penny. Penny tells them that after she came to from the anesthetic, she saw her father. Alex tells Janet that they will try and get Penny to relive the events that caused her paralysis. Rudy Meyer (Harvey Lembeck), a hospital attendant, tries to cheer Penny up by showing her how he can dance. Later, they put Penny in a semi-conscious state. They figure out that what Penny saw was Dr. Phillips, who is also in the Naval reserves, in uniform. They get Penny to see Dr. Phillips in uniform again and she is then able to walk.
133	20	"Donna's Prima Donna"	Barry Shear	Barbara Hammer	February 1, 1962
Donna is excited to take Mary to look over the college that Donna went to. Donna's excitement is starting to drive Alex crazy. Donna tells Mary that they will be going to the college this weekend. Mary tells Donna she wants to skip college to pursue a singing career. Donna and Alex think they should insist that Mary go to college. Donna comes up with a plan and gets her friend Caroline to help. Caroline tells Donna and Mary that they need some entertainment at the college orientation. She does not think she is ready but Mary reluctantly agrees to go and sing. Instead of driving, Donna wants Mary to get used to riding a bus. In between performances, Mary will be spending a lot of time on a bus. After they arrive, Donna and Mary go to a malt shop. Mary says she likes the town. Danny (James Stacy) comes by. As a senior, he is to welcome new potential students. Mary agrees to let Danny show her around the school. Donna tells Caroline that it does not seem that Mary has changed her mind about college. Donna is still skeptical of Mary's singing career until she hears her sing "Johnny Angel". Donna tells Mary that she has real talent. Mary decides she likes the college and will join the Glee Club there. Note: This is where Shelley Fabares introduced the song "Johnny Angel", which went on to become a big pop hit for her.
134	21	"Explorer's Ten"	Barry Shear	David R. Schwartz	February 8, 1962
After listening to Professor Earnshaw (Ken Niles) give a talk on space travel, Jeff and his Explorers Club friends decide to raise money to buy a telescope. Jeff talks to the family about going to the moon. He also mentions that he will wash cars to help raise money. Mary reminds Jeff that the next day is Donna's birthday. The next day, Jeff is so busy washing cars, he forgets to get Donna's present and be home on time to go to dinner. When he finally gets home, he falls asleep and the family goes to dinner without him. Jeff goes to see his friend Mr. Coxey (Earle Hodgins) at the Home for Senior Citizens and brings him some cookies Donna made. Jeff talks to him about going to the moon and his Explorers Club. Mr. Coxey tells Jeff how much he would like to see Washington, D.C. Jeff asks his club if they could use the money to send Mr. Coxey to D.C. instead of buying the telescope. They all agree. Before he leaves, Mr. Coxey tells the boys how much what they did means to him. The boys later find a new telescope in their clubhouse bought by their fathers. Allan Hunt as Howard, leader of the club.
135	22	"The New Office"	Norman Tokar	Leo Solomon & Ben Gershman	February 15, 1962
Alex is with patient little Harold, when loud music from a radio starts playing. He has to go tell Mary to turn it down. Then Jeff makes a loud noise from the garage. More interruptions happen. Alex considers moving his practice out of the house and into an office downtown, where patients will not be disturbed by his family's activities. Everyone one in the family brings up reasons why it might be a good idea to move. Donna and Alex go to see the empty office space. It is a very large space, but there is also a lot of traffic noise outside. Alex thinks he might look elsewhere. A Dr. Gardner comes by and says how perfect the building is. He also mentions that a new by-pass will be opening next week and all the traffic outside will be diverted. Milt Lewis, the building manager, comes by. Alex signs a five year lease. The movers begin taking things out of Alex's home office. The family starts to have second thoughts and asks Alex to stay. Alex thinks about it and decides it is time to move on, time for something new. Victor French as Mike the Mover.
136	23	"The Golden Trap"	Jeffrey Hayden	Paul West	February 22, 1962
Donna and Alex will be going out of town for a day and a night. Mary is confident she can handle Jeff and the house. Alex is in a hurry and he agrees to let Mary run the house. Jeff wants to go fishing with Smitty (Darryl Richard), but Mary tells him to do the dishes first. Janice (Charla Doherty) calls Mary and the two arrange to listen to some records that evening. Janice manages to spread the word and several other friends decide to go to Mary's. Carl Pruitt (Alan Carney), the plumber, comes by to check the water heater. Jeff comes home with a lot of fish and he puts them in the bathtub. Scotty (Jimmy Hawkins) calls Mary and asks her out for that evening. She says she cannot go because she has to watch the house. Scotty then learns there is going to be a party at Mary's house and he gets mad that she did not invite him. Pruitt tells Mary he cannot fix the heater and she will have to get a new one. Mary says she cannot make that decision. Pruitt now has to pump out the basement. Donna calls Jeff and says that they will not need to stay over night and will be home later. Mary is stunned when all the kids show up. Mary has to take control. She manages to get all her friends out of the house. She tells Pruitt to replace the heater. Mary then shows Scotty that there is not a party, and all before Alex and Donna come home. Johnny Washbrook as Bill. Allan Hunt as Stan. Swoosie Kurtz as Mimi.
137	24	"Free Flight"	Gene Nelson	John Whedon	March 1, 1962
Donna is excited about a party coming up. Alex says he will be in Cleveland that day, but he will catch an earlier flight home. It is the day of the party and Alex is not home yet. Donna gets a phone call from Alex and he says the return flight is stuck in Cleveland. Mary and Jeff suggest Donna go to the party by herself, but she will not. Donna is so mad that she sends a telegram complaining about an airline's service directly to the President (Vinton Hayworth) of Condor Airlines. Mr. Conners (William Lanteau), the Publicity Director of Condor Airlines, comes up with a campaign using Donna's telegram. Alex finally gets home. Donna's friend Edie (Dorothy Lovett) calls because she saw in the paper that the airline gave her and Alex two free tickets. Donna would like to go to Tahiti. At the airport, Conners meets Donna and Alex. Conners was expecting a much older woman. The photographer suggests to Conners a different type of campaign. Conners also mentions to Donna that the flight will be going to Alaska. Donna is very disappointed, but Alex is willing to go. When the flight is delayed by quite a few hours, Alex and Donna decide they have had enough and want to go home. Conners tries to talk them into staying, but they leave. Robert Shayne as Joe.
138	25	"The Wide Open Spaces"	Jeffrey Hayden	Sumner Long	March 8, 1962
Donna and Alex are going to visit their friends David (William Windom) and Millie (Patricia Breslin) Adams. The Adams' moved from Hilldale to a farm in the country to escape the rigors of living in the city. Alex is surprised by the move as neither one knows anything about farm life. Meanwhile on the farm, David and Millie are getting ready for Alex and Donna's arrival. Millie wants to take a bath, but her sons Steve and Les are washing a goat in the tub. Alex and Donna arrive. After dinner, Alex and Donna are sitting outside enjoying the night air. Millie comments to David how good Donna and Alex look. Millie is upset because she thinks she is getting wrinkles on her face. Millie is starting to have second thoughts and believes David is working too hard. David shows Alex his old horse, Duke. Duke does not do anything around the farm anymore. David then has Alex sit in his tractor. The tractor starts up and Alex cannot control it. David and farmhand Jimmy (Jimmy Hawkins) go chasing after him. The tractor finally stops. That night, Duke is laying on the ground. David tells the boys that he does not think Duke has long to live. When Duke hears the bells on his harness, he gets up. David realizes that Duke wants to work and that working on the farm is worth it. Note: This episode was a back door pilot. The new series was to be a fish-out-of-water situation comedy to replace The Donna Reed Show after Reed had announced her intentions to retire from television. The episodes were not picked up as a series after Reed decided not to retire. The concept of city folk moving to the country was used again by rival studio Filmways for Green Acres.
139	26	"The Fireball"	Norman Tokar	Paul West	March 15, 1962
Donna tells Alex that Mrs. Wilcox, from the school, called. Despite being very good at it, Jeff is reluctant to be in the school play. Alex finds a way to get Jeff interested. Jeff and Angie rehearse their lines for the play. They start to reminisce about the way they first met. Jeff had invited Angie to a party and then left without her. They both get angry with each other. Jeff then refuses to be in the play with Angie. Donna talks both of them into working together. Donna recalls some things from the past and starts a fight with Alex. Angie comes by and complains about Jeff to Mary and Donna. Jeff complains about Angie to Alex. Jeff and Angie start rehearsing again, but things are not very civil. After a while, they make up. Seeing this, Donna and Alex make up as well.
140	27	"Once Upon a Timepiece"	Robert Ellis Miller	David R. Schwartz	March 22, 1962
Alex learns that his watch is not keeping time correctly. Jeff shows Donna and Alex his report card and it is not good. Alex says that competition is tough and guys who come in second are in trouble. Donna goes to town and buys an antique gold pocket watch, despite it being a little expensive. Alex loves the watch. They discover an inscription on it. It had been given to a Curtis Babock (Crahan Denton) upon his graduation from Harvard in 1935 by his father. Donna goes back to the pawn shop and finds out it was sold by Curtis. Mr. Logan, the pawn shop owner, calls Alex because he found out where Curtis is staying. Alex goes to see Curtis at the flophouse he is staying at. Alex invites Curtis over for dinner. Curtis tells them how his father wanted him to be a lawyer, but he wanted to study birds. After college, Curtis just left to travel the world. He wrote a manuscript about his travels. It is a month later and Jeff's report card is much better. Curtis comes by in a new car. Inspired by the Stones, he submitted his manuscript to a publisher, who bought it. Curtis says that a movie studio bought it and gave him $50,000. Alex sells Curtis his watch back and Curtis gives Alex a wristwatch.
141	28	"Hilldale 500"	Barry Shear	John Whedon	March 29, 1962
Jeff is interested in entering go-cart races. He shows Alex a go-cart at the hardware store. He does not have the money to buy one and Donna is completely against it. Alex, however, is getting interested. Alex and Jeff go to Foss's Hardware store where kids are allowed to drive their go-carts in the parking lot. Smitty is there and he is letting Angie drive his go-cart. They talk Alex into driving it. Jeff and Alex talk about building their own go-cart. Early one morning, Jeff is in the garage working on the cart. Alex goes out to tell him to stop making noise. Alex winds up helping Jeff until Donna shows up. Jeff finishes building his cart, but is disappointed in the way it looks. Angie sits in it and it breaks. Alex, Jeff and Angie build a really nice go-cart. Donna sits in it and drives off. She causes some problems for the mailman, the milkman and some other people. Jeff enters a race and after a while he is in the lead. But, a scarf that Angie gave him blows into his face and he crashes. Jeff and the cart are OK. Alex enters the fathers' race.
142	29	"Winner Takes All"	Norman Tokar	John Whedon	April 5, 1962
Jeff is wondering whether Alex will show up to his baseball game. Jeff tells Donna how Moose's (Allan Hunt) father, Mr. Edwards (Ken Lynch), always goes to the games. The team that wins today will be sent to Springfield to play the winner there. Alex and Donna meet Mr. Edwards and they can tell he really pushes Moose to be better on the field and in life. Mr. Edwards takes the boys off to practice. Donna knows Alex is really tired, but she thinks he should go to the game. It is the seventh inning of the game and Jeff's team is winning. During the game, Mr. Edwards berates Moose to the point that he throws a wild pitch and injures the batter. Alex helps take the unconscious boy off the field and to the hospital. Later, Jeff asks Donna if Moose can stay at their house for a couple days. Moose does not want to go home and face his father. Alex comes home and says the boy has a concussion, but he will be OK. Mr. Edwards comes by the house. Alex decides to talk to the overbearing father about teens and sports. Alex tells him that everyone cannot always be a winner, people need to learn how to be able to lose. Mr. Edwards apologizes to Moose and says he just wanted Moose to be the champ he never was. Art Reichle as the Umpire.
143	30	"Skin Deep"	Jeffrey Hayden	Paul West	April 12, 1962
Mary tells Donna that her friend Ann set her up on a blind date with a Gregory Taylor. Mary is really looking forward to it. Donna and Alex are against blind dates. Alex insists on meeting him. Gregory comes over and Mary finds him unattractive because of his large ears. Mary makes up an excuse and cancels the date. Alex tells Mary he is not proud of her when he finds out she canceled because of Gregory's ears. Mary dreams that she has an enlarged nose. Alex tells her that these things happen sometime. Ann comes by and tells Mary about Gregory. Ann finds Mary's nose funny, but she says that looks are not everything. Stan (Allan Hunt) and Ritchie are fighting over who will take Mary out. When they see Mary's nose, neither boy wants to go out with her. Gregory comes by and does not mind Mary's nose. He says he wishes things could have worked out between them. Mary wakes up from her dream. Mary finds Gregory and tells him she wants to keep their date. After the date, Mary tells Alex and Donna it was a perfect time.
144	31	"The Fortune Teller"	Jeffrey Hayden	John Whedon	April 19, 1962
Donna is coaxed by friend Edie (Dorothy Lovett) into being a fortune teller at the town's bazaar. Edie will even get a gypsy outfit for Donna. The next day, Alex takes Donna out to lunch. Alex tells her that he has an opportunity to invest in an oil company that a friend is starting. He wants to know if he should do it, but Donna does not give him a direct answer. It is the day of the bazaar and Donna's first customer is a little boy. Not knowing what to do, Donna makes up fortunes to tell people. Donna tells her friend Ethel (Evans Evans) that she will soon marry. Donna tells Edie that she is a fraud and wants to stop. But Edie tells her she is making the people happy. A man (Doodles Weaver) starts flirting with Donna until Alex shows up. Alex asks Donna again about the oil company, but she will not give him an answer. Later, Ethel and the little boy come by the house and tell Jeff and Mary their fortunes came true. Things that Donna tells Mary and Jeff make them think Donna has powers. Donna starts to believe she has ESP. Alex says there are probably logical explanations. But when Donna hints that Alex should invest in the oil company, he goes to write his friend a letter. But then something Donna says makes Alex have second thoughts. Later, there is an article in the paper about his friend being arrested in an oil stock fraud.
145	32	"Man of Action"	Barry Shear	Paul West	April 26, 1962
Donna is going through Jeff's old toys because she is finally going to give them away. Alex complains about all the kids he had to deal with that morning. Jeff and his friend Smitty are stuck watching Hoby, Smitty's little brother. Alex is looking forward to playing golf later. Jeff and Smitty convince Donna to watch Hoby while they go to visit their girlfriends. They say they will only be gone a half an hour. Donna has to go out sooner than she thought. She leaves Hoby with Alex and says the boys will be back soon. It has been an hour and a half and the boys are still not back. Dr. Jim Higgins (C. Lindsay Workman) and Dr. Frank Bennett come by to pick Alex up to go golfing. Alex says he will not be able to go because of Hoby. They try and think of someone to watch the boy. Jeff's friend Midge comes by. They try and talk her into watching the boy but she has somewhere else to be. Alex tells Jim and Frank to play golf without him. Alex and Hoby are playing with an electric train. Jeff and Smitty show up the same time Donna does. They realize that Alex was stuck watching Hoby and missed his golf game. Alex actually did not seem to mind.
146	33	"Donna Meets Roberta"	Jeffrey Hayden	Sumner Long	May 3, 1962
At the Charity Bazaar, Paul Smith (Harry Holcombe) tells Alex that Roberta Summers (Roberta Sherwood, playing a fictional version of herself) is selling her house cheap. Because a shopping center will be built across the street, in another year the house's value will rise and Alex should consider buying it. Donna thinks what they are considering is sneaky. Donna finds out that Roberta is a widower and has three sons to care for. Later, Roberta goes to see her brother, Dudley Brockton (Gale Gordon), at his Pharmacy. She tells him that a man made her an offer for the house. Meanwhile, Jeff makes a shrewd business deal by buying a transistor radio cheap from a friend knowing he can get much more for it. Alex comes by Roberta's house and meets Dudley. Alex comes home all excited because he bought the house. Donna is not happy. Dudley is very happy, but Roberta thinks he should've told Alex the things that were wrong with the house. Donna has a talk with Jeff about the radio and his friend Doug. Donna tells Alex that Jeff gave the radio back and she was very proud of him. It is during the night and Alex gets a call from Roberta because one of her sons is sick. After Alex looks in on the boy, Roberta tells him there some things he needs to know about the house. Alex then tells her his information. Back at home, Alex tells Donna he told Roberta about the shopping center. The two families get together for Dudley's birthday. Note: Todon Productions, Donna Reed's production company, used the end of that episode to introduce the pilot of Sherwood's own show, which co-starred Gale Gordon but never aired. The three Lanning brothers, who play Roberta's sons, were Roberta Sherwood's sons in real life.
147	34	"The Caravan"	Barry Shear	Phil Sharp	May 10, 1962
The family cannot agree on a family trip. Alex says they should appoint one person to make the decision and Donna is the one picked. Later, Donna shows the family a large RV she rented and she says they will drive out West to Lake Mead. They drive all day and then find a spot to stop for the night. Donna and Alex cannot get the stove to light, so they cook the meal over a campfire. It starts to rain. The next morning, Alex gets stuck in his sleeping bag. A Garage Man (Al Checco) comes by to see if the RV was stuck because of the rain. The man gets the stove to work and then he works to set Alex free. As the trip continues, it turns out to be more work and problems for Donna, while everyone else seems to enjoy it. Donna is tired, so Alex tries to make breakfast, which does not go smoothly. They arrive at Lake Mead and the work continues to pile up for Donna. Their next stop is Las Vegas. Donna points out all the beautiful hotels. Alex gets the message and he decides to spend a night in a hotel so Donna can be waited on. That night, despite being in a big comfortable bed, Donna cannot seem to fall asleep. Donna believes she will be able to sleep in the RV. When she gets there, she finds the rest of the family sleeping. Donna gets stuck in her sleeping bag.
148	35	"The Swingin' Set"	Gene Nelson	Paul West	May 17, 1962
Jeff and Smitty are worried because they do not have dates to the Junior Prom. A pretty girl comes up to Jeff with a letter for Dr. Stone that was misdelivered to her house. Jeff is so starstruck, he forgets to ask her name. Alex walks by and Jeff is still in a daze. Jeff would love to take her to the prom, but he does not know how to find her. That night, Jeff fantasizes about dancing with the girl. The next day Smitty tells Jeff that he saw a new girl working at the malt shop and he wants to take her to the prom. Smitty makes Jeff go with him to the malt shop to be his wing man. When they get there, Jeff realizes it is the same girl. She says her family just moved to town and her name is Laurie Wesson (Mimsy Farmer). Jeff is sad when Smitty asks her to the prom and she says yes. Donna tells Alex about a new girl in town, Jan Streeter (Patricia Lyon), who she would like to have Jeff meet. Jeff reluctantly meets Jan and they have an awkward conversation. He asks her to the Prom and despite not making a good first impression, Jan says yes. It is the night of the Prom and Jeff and Jan run into Smitty and Laurie. Smitty is instantly attracted to Jan and the boys switch dates. The two couples have a wonderful night. Note: While Shelley Fabares is absent from this episode, she can be heard singing "Johnny Angel" when the boys are in the malt shop. Also, Paul Petersen sings "Keep Your Love Locked" during a gimmick at the Prom.
149	36	"On to Fairview"	Jeffrey Hayden	Paul West	May 24, 1962
Jeff gets a job at Mr. Varney's (Paul Tripp) bicycle shop to earn spending money. He goes to Mr. Merriam (Carter DeHaven) at the jewelry store because he wants a surprise gift for a special girl. Mr. Varney is running a contest to win a bicycle. Jeff has been skipping his chores at home and Donna is furious. Donna wants him to clean his room before going out. Jeff says he is all done, but Donna finds out that he just put everything in the closet. Jeff has to get to work, but Donna wants things cleaned first. Jeff sneaks out of the house. At the bike shop, Jeff has to ride a bike on a treadmill for the equivalent of 30 miles for the contest. Customers will try to guess how long it takes him. While Jeff is riding, Smitty tells him his parents are looking for him and they are mad. It is starting to get cold, so Jeff asks Smitty to go get his jacket from home. At the house, Smitty runs into Donna who asks where Jeff is. Alex finds Jeff on the bike treadmill. Alex tells Donna where Jeff is and he is doing it to earn money to buy the jewelry. Donna gets upset that he is doing all this for Laurie Wesson. It starts to rain. Alex and Mr. Varney come by with umbrellas. Jeff makes the 30 miles, gets paid and goes to the jewelry store. After all this, it turns out the locket was for Donna, not Laurie. Julie Bennett as Lady Customer.
150	37	"The Man in the Mask"	Norman Tokar	Story by : Tom & Helen August; Teleplay by : Paul West & Tom & Helen August	May 31, 1962
Next week is a Sadie Hawkins dance, and Jeff has not been asked yet. Donna tells him that the way he has been treating Angie lately, she is not surprised. Jeff manages to get an interview with Don Drysdale, all-star pitcher for the Los Angeles Dodgers, for the school newspaper. Jeff and Smitty go to see the girls two softball teams practice. Jeff thinks Angie is going to ask him to the dance, but he gets drafted into being the umpire for the important all-girl softball series. Drysdale comes by the Stone's house and asks Alex if Jeff is there. He got tied up at a meeting and missed his appointment with Jeff. Jeff comes home ranting and raving about Drysdale not showing up, not knowing he is outside with Alex, listening. Jeff sees Drysdale and is embarrassed. Drysdale pretends he did not hear anything and Jeff gets his interview. It is the next day and time for the game. Angie and Marcia, the captains of the teams, are both flattering Jeff. In the first part of the game, the girls walk all over him. In the second, after some advice from Drysdale, he takes a firmer hand. But, because of his firmer stance, Smitty tells Jeff every girl in town is going to hate him. Later, Angie comes by and tells Jeff that all the girls thought he did a great job as umpire. She then asks him to the dance. Just then, Marcia comes by and asks Jeff as well.
151	38	"The Father Image"	Richard L. Bare	Paul West	June 7, 1962
Jeff is worried about his driver's license test later that day. He asks Donna if Alex is home yet. She says that Alex will be home when he gets out of surgery. Mary wants Alex to help repair a pair of shoes she needs for her high school graduation ceremony that evening. Alex has a young girl patient who just had surgery and he and Dr. Dick Morley are very concerned about her chances. Alex tells Mr. (Walter Reed) and Mrs. Boardman their daughter came through surgery. The next few hours will tell how she does. When Alex gets home, Jeff and Mary are all over him about their problems. Donna makes them go away. All Alex can think about is the little girl, but he is not telling Donna. Mary tells Alex what a sure and confident father he is, but she can tell his mind is somewhere else. Alex calls Dick and there is no change with the girl. Donna asks Alex what is bothering him, but he will not tell her. Mary tells Alex and Donna that because Jeannie has laryngitis, she will have to give the valedictory address. Laurie comes by and she talks to Jeff about what they can do once he gets his license. Donna calls the hospital and finds out what Alex is so concerned about. She tells the children that their problems are nothing compared to Alex's. Alex gets a call that the girl will be O.K. Jeff gets his license and drives the family to Mary's graduation.
152	39	"Dear Wife"	Stanley Z. Cherry	Paul West	June 14, 1962
The family comes back from the wedding of one of Mary's friends. Donna says the girl looked so young. Mary caught the bride's bouquet. Mary has a date that night with Roger Perry, one of the ushers at the wedding. Alex jokes he would pay Mary $1000 to elope and save him the cost of a wedding. Mary tells Donna that Roger is leaving for Las Vegas to go work at Boulder Dam right after the party. Mary says she is in love with Roger. Mary wants Donna to understand that she is not a little girl anymore. Alex thinks it is just a passing thing. Jeff tells Alex and Donna that he just saw Mary leaving for the party with a suitcase. Alex panics. He calls the party and has an awkward conversation with Mary. It is 3 o'clock in the morning and Mary is not home yet. Alex calls the airport and finds out that there was a girl with Roger boarding the plane. Just then, Mary comes down the stairs wondering why Alex and Donna were up. The next morning, Mary tells her parents that she loaned her suitcase to Roger's sister.

=== Season 5 (1962–63) ===
No. overall	No. in season	Title	Directed by	Written by	Original release date
153	1	"Mister Nice Guy"	Jeffrey Hayden	Paul West	September 20, 1962
Mary is cleaning out her closet when she finds some of Jeff's things in there. When Mary reprimands Jeff, he simply says he is sorry, which surprises her. Alex believes Mr. Pruitt the Plumber (Alan Carney) wants something for nothing when he asks Alex to look at his sore arm. Mary tells Donna that Jeff is being uncharacteristically nice to her. Alex tells Donna that Jeff probably has an ulterior motive. Jeff fixes Mary's broken radio and Mary is sure he is up to something. Jeff then picks up a dress for Mary from the cleaners. When Alex finds a broken outdoor faucet, he thinks Pruitt had something to do with it. Pruitt comes by and says he will fix the faucet. there is an upcoming auto show and Mary figures Jeff will want to borrow money from her. Donna finds a letter Jeff was writing to a friend. In it he talks about how he has come to realize how much he will miss Mary when she goes off to college. Alex also has to change his mind when Pruitt fixes the faucet for nothing.
154	2	"Mrs. Stone and Doctor Hyde"	Gene Nelson	Barbara Avedon	September 27, 1962
Alma (Marge Redmond), Alex's nurse-receptionist, tells Donna that she is getting married in a couple days. she will be gone a week and has been trying to find someone to fill in. Donna tells Alex that she can do the job, but Alex does not think it is a good idea. It is Donna's first morning on the job and things are not going smoothly. Donna and Alex then get into a fight. Alice (Sally Mansfield) and Gloria (Renee Godfrey) are at a diner complaining about their husbands. They mention what a great husband Donna has. Donna comes in and the women say how nice it must be to work with Alex. Donna lets them know what it is really like. Alex then comes in and the women give him the cold shoulder. Back at the office, Donna acts very professional and then tells Alex she is quitting Just then Mr. Drucker (Dick Wilson), the butcher from across the street, brings in a small boy who is unconscious. Alex and Donna have to forget their differences in order to work together to save his life. The boy does come to and will be fine. Donna will finish working the week.
155	3	"To Be a Boy"	Gene Nelson	Paul West	October 4, 1962
Mary wonders why Jeff spends so much time with Smitty and not with girls. Donna asks Jeff if he has heard from Angie. Mary says that Laurie told her Jeff had not called her in a week. Jeff and Smitty plan to build a sailboat. Mary tells Donna about a friend from college, Joanne Wells (Brooke Bundy). She is only 16, but in college do to her IQ. Jeff and Smitty decide to not go on dates so they can save their money to build the sail boat. Mary would like Jeff to get to know Joanne. She brings Joanne to the house and will try to get Jeff to ask her to an upcoming dance. While Mary is on the phone, Joanne looks around Jeff's room. When she hears Jeff coming, she hides under his bed. Mary wonders where Joanne went. Jeff finds Joanne and they get along quite well. Things get confusing when Smitty comes by and Jeff has to hide Joanne in his closet. Caroline Myers (Cindy Carol) comes by the house to see Smitty. Both boys decide they are not going to give up girls.
156	4	"Who Needs Glasses?"	Jeffrey Hayden	Sumner Long	October 11, 1962
Donna wants everyone to be quiet because she has an angel food cake in the oven. Jeff gets a call from his old girlfriend Angie (Candy Moore), who says she is back in town. Jeff's loud excitement causes the cake to collapse. Jeff meets Angie at the malt shop and she has an older look about her. She tells Jeff that she went out with slightly older boys in Chicago. she will go out with Jeff even though he looks younger. Jeff figures if he wears glasses he will look older. He pretends to have trouble seeing so his parents will send him to Dr. Allison (Harvey Korman) to have his eyes checked. Jeff convinces the doctor to prescribe him glasses. Alex is suspicious of Jeff's motives. Alex calls up Dr. Allison and finds out that Jeff does not really need the glasses, but Jeff insisted. Jeff comes downstairs in a suit and tie. Angie thanks the dressed up, glasses wearing Jeff for making her see how pretending to be older was silly. Jeff tells his parents the truth and agrees to paint the garage to pay for the glasses. Donna reminds Alex of some of the phases he went through.
157	5	"Mary, Mary, Quite Contrary"	Andrew McCullough	Elroy Schwartz & Austin Kalish	October 18, 1962
Alex is furious that Mary constantly ties up the phone talking to her friends. Mary feels she wants privacy from the family and needs to be independent. She decides she wants to move into a dorm on the college campus. Alex does not understand why she needs to leave, but reluctantly agrees. Mary meets her new roommate Pat Walker (Cheryl Holdridge). A week has passed and Mary calls home. Mary tells Donna she would like to spend the weekend at home. Donna says that her and Alex were invited to stay with friends for the weekend. Donna tells her that she could go with, but Mary does not want to be in way. There is not much for Mary to do at the dorm. Alex is surprised how quiet the house has been for the last couple weeks. Donna and Alex agree to not make it look as though they have missed Mary too much when she comes to visit. On the drive home, both Donna and Mary claim to like the way things are now. Back at the dorm, Mary tells Pat how different things were at home. Mary makes a surprise visit. Mary tells Donna that she realizes she is not ready just yet to live away from home. Mary says goodbye to Pat. Back at home, it is not long before Mary and Jeff are fighting again.
158	6	"My Dad"	Gene Nelson	Barbara Avedon	October 25, 1962
It is Father & Son Week in town. Alex & Jeff have entered a Father & Son golf tournament. They are paired up with Smitty and his Father (Ray Montgomery). Just as they are about to start playing, Alex is called away by a medical emergency. Jeff is disappointed as this seems to happen all the time. An attempt to go bowling that evening also falls through when Alex falls asleep. When Alex wakes up, he feels bad that Jeff had to bowl without him. Jeff comes home and Alex agrees to have some cake with him. Alex gets another phone call, but is able to stay home. The next day Alex gets to the Father & Son Luncheon just in time for desert. At the end of Father & Son week, the boys were to put on a show. On the way there, Alex, Donna and Mary are stopped by a policeman who tells Alex they need his help. A little girl was injured in an accident. This means Alex will miss the show. The show is over and Jeff realizes his family was not there. They finally show up. Alex explains that he had to save a girl's life. The band is still there and they convince Jeff to perform the song "My Dad" for Alex. Jeff loves his father even if he is not always there. Later, Alex and Jeff finally have time to play golf and it starts to rain. George Holmes as Golfer.
159	7	"Fine Feathers"	Gene Nelson	Andy White	November 1, 1962
Jeff rescues a bird and brings it home. Jeff wants to go to Laurie's house, but Alex tells him to make a cage for the bird. The next day, Donna tells Jeff to look in the paper to see if anyone reported a lost bird. Alex then suggests that Jeff put an ad in the paper. Jeff calls his friend Coach Herb Nicholson, who is into birds. After Jeff describes the bird, Herb says it could be a rose-breasted cockatoo worth $400. Jeff thinks he is going to be rich. Alex tells Jeff to call Mrs. Bentley (Beth Peters) at the pet shop. Mrs. Bentley also says it could be worth a lot. Donna still wants him to put an ad in the paper about the bird. After several days, Herb comes over to see the bird. Herb tells him it is not an expensive cockatoo but a cheap cockatiel. Jeff now loses interest in the bird. Somehow the bird got out of its cage and out an open window. A little boy named Larry answers the ad and says the bird is his. Jeff tells the boy to come back in a couple hours. Just when Larry comes back, the bird shows up and Jeff can give it to him.
160	8	"Rebel with a Cause"	Gene Nelson	Barbara Avedon	November 8, 1962
Carter Melville (Harvey Korman) stops by the house and wants Donna to be in a research project about the typical average housewife. The family invites Carter to dinner. Once Donna hears more about the project, she resents being classified as just a typical housewife. The next morning, Donna is still irritated about being thought of as a statistic. Cal Winslow (Harold Gould), the newspaper editor, offers her a chance to get a scoop for the paper. Cal tells Donna that Jason Farnum (Bill Zuckert) is back in town. Donna remembers that Jason used to work for her father. Jason is offering $50,000 for some worthless land on the edge of town and Winslow wants to know why. Winslow would like Donna to get the story and because she does not want to be average anymore, she agrees to it. Donna goes to the hotel where Jason is and speaks with the Hotel Manager, Mr. Carothers (Dick Wilson). Carothers refuses to let Donna see Jason. Several attempts by Donna to find out Jason's room number fail. Donna goes undercover as a hotel maid and finally finds Jason's room. Jason recognizes her right away. Because Jason knew Donna's father, he tells her the reason he wants the land and it has to do with his mother. The family is surprised when they see Donna's story in the newspaper. Helena Carroll as Jeanette.
161	9	"Big Star"	Jeffrey Hayden	Paul West & Barbara Avedon	November 15, 1962
Mary's new boyfriend, Clay Shannon, has a great singing voice, but he is also very shy. Alex finds him to be quite clumsy as well. Mary makes it her personal project that she will get him to sing for Geri Harris (Betsy Jones-Moreland), a talent agent. Mary tells Clay that she wants him to go with her to see Professor Raskin (Arthur Malet) from the college. Raskin knows Geri and he might be able to help. Clay relunctantly agrees to meet Raskin later that day. Mary is at Raskin's office and Clay does not show up. Mary takes Raskin to the nursery where Clay works. Mary finds Clay and he apologizes for not going to see Raskin. Mary gets Clay to sing to her. What Clay does not know is that Raskin is hiding not far away and listens in. Clay then sees Raskin and runs off. Raskin agrees to set up an appointment with Harris. When they get to Harris' hotel room, Clay changes his mind and wants to leave. Mary finally talks him into knocking on the door. A woman answers the door. Mary and Clay thought that Geri Harris was a man. The woman is Geri Harris and Clay has no problem singing for her. Mary realizes now that he will be a big star and she will probably never see him again. Note: Mary sings the song "Big Star".
162	10	"Man to Man"	Andrew McCullough	Paul West	November 22, 1962
Mary tells Donna that Jeff and Smitty are planning something involving Alex. Alex is thrilled when Jeff talks him into going camping. Alex thinks it is the perfect situation for bonding time with his son. Jeff then pulls a fast one and has Smitty come with. It is very crowded in the car. Alex does not know it, but the campsite is near the campsite where Jeff and Smitty's girlfriends are camping. While Smitty goes to look for some firewood, Alex thinks it is a good time to have a father-son talk. Jeff sneaks off to look for the girl's camp with Smitty. Two boys, Jerry and Rick, see Alex talking to himself. Jerry and Rick are friends of Jeff and Smitty. They tell Alex about the plan to meet up with the girls. Jeff and Smitty find Angie and Maxine. They tell the girls to come by their camp that evening and bring girls for Jerry and Rick. Jeff and Smitty find out that Alex knows about the girls. Alex tells Jeff and Smitty they need to get things ready for when the girls arrive. When the girls come over, the party falls flat. Alex helps to liven things up. Jeff apologizes to Alex for deceiving him and they have their father-son talk. Mary is surprised when the two come happily home.
163	11	"The Baby Buggy"	Andrew McCullough	John Whedon	November 29, 1962
Donna is about to drive Alex and Jeff to play golf. Obstetrician Harriet Robey (Fay Bainter) drives up in her old car. She asks Alex's help in delivering triplets. It takes a bit of doing to get the old car started. Turns out it was only twins. Donna thinks Harriet should receive some kind of financial support in recognition for all her years of service to the town. Donna talks banker Joe McVey (Hayden Rorke) into setting up a retirement fund for Harriet. They will try to get all the people that owe her money to contribute. Alex mentions to Harriet that the city might want to do something for her. Harriet resents people thinking she is too old to keep doing what she is doing and she does not want charity. Alex tells Donna and Joe that they should respect Harriet's wishes and just forget the whole thing. Joe says there is already $2000 collected. Jeff suggests that they take the money and buy her a new car because hers is falling apart. They decide to get her a sports car. They will present it to her at the athletic awards program where she hands out the trophys. It is the night of the awards and Harriet and Principal Moorehead (Richard Deacon) are reading the names of the winners. Alex is about to tell Harriet about the car, when she has to leave for a medical emergency. Everyone follows her outside where she is given the car and she is quite moved.
164	12	"The Makeover Man"	Gene Nelson	Ralph Goodman	December 6, 1962
Mary goes on a date with Steve Callahan (James Stacy), who is crude, juvenile and unmannerly. She tells Alex and Donna that Steve has potential and she is just the person to change him. Steve comes by to pick up Mary and he is everything that Mary said he was. Alex and Jeff found Steve funny and Donna thinks Mary has her work cut out for her. Mary is at first upset with Steve, but then she has a talk with him and he agrees to let her help him. Mary has Steve show up on time and dress better. Every day, Mary works on another part of his personality. It has been a couple of weeks and even the Basketball Coach notices Steve is not himself. One of the boys (Allan Hunt) says that Mary has him under her thumb. Mary wants to have Steve over for dinner so the family can see the "new" Steve. At a dress shop, Donna hears a woman, Gloria, talking to another woman about how Steve has changed. It turns out Gloria is his sister. Gloria says that Steve has been going down hill ever since he started hanging out with Mary. Donna talks to Mary and Alex talks to Steve and they get the old Steve back.
165	13	"The Winning Ticket"	Andrew McCullough	Phil Davis	December 13, 1962
Jeff enters a raffle where the prize is an expensive sports car. Donna accidentally threw the tickets in the trash. Jeff has to rummage through the garbage, but he does find them. At the drawing for the prize, Jeff sees a woman with a little girl drop a ticket on the ground. Jeff picks up the ticket. The woman disappears into the crowd and Jeff is not able to see where she went. While his tickets did not win, the woman's ticket does and he claims the car. Jeff brings the car home. He mentions to the family how the winning ticket was dropped by a woman. Alex thinks they should try and find the woman. An Insurance Man comes by wanting to sell Jeff a policy. The car causes some problems with Jeff's friends and when he tries to get a job to pay for the insurance. While out for a drive, Jeff sees the woman with the little girl. He calls out to them, but they do not hear him. He follows them and finds out where they live, but does not say anything. After a week, he tells Donna and she tells him to bring the car to the woman. Jeff does it and feels much better. Anjanette Comer as Barbie, a friend of Jeff's.
166	14	"The Soft Touch"	Andrew McCullough	Ben Gershman & Milton Pascal	December 20, 1962
Alex comes home late from a house call. He would like to have another doctor take over those calls. Meanwhile, Jeff needs money to take a boat trip with Smitty and some girls. Jeff is learning how hard it is to ask friends to pay back money he loaned them. Alex says that Jeff shouldn't be so soft about getting people to pay him back. Donna feels bad for Jeff and thinks they should give him an advance on his allowance. Donna reminds Alex that he has to learn how to collect payments from his patients. The next morning, Donna hints again that Alex needs to send out payment reminders. Alex has a hard time actually writing out a reminder. He then comes up with reasons to not send a reminder to many of his patients. Jeff tells the family that he has served notice on all his friends that owe him money and has given them a deadline. But instead of cash, Jeff winds up collecting various used items. Donna finds out that Alex still has not mailed out the reminders. Alex finally mails them. Alex gets a call from one of the men that owe him money asking to come check on his daughter. Alex goes to make the house call.
167	15	"Jeff Stands Alone"	Andrew McCullough	Barbara Avedon	December 27, 1962
Alex scolds Jeff for being lazy and taking forever to get the car polished. He tells Jeff that a telephone lineman has been working outside since before Jeff even woke up. Jeff accidentally runs over Sandy (James Stacy) the lineman's lunch box. Sandy tells Jeff he has it soft and has no idea what it is like to live on his own. Jeff would like to prove Sandy wrong. Jeff asks Smitty what he would do if he were in a strange town with no money. The next day, Jeff talks to Sandy again. Jeff decides to spend the weekend alone in the big city of Farrington to see for himself. Smitty will do the same. Jeff tells his parents that he and Smitty are going camping. On the drive to Farrington, Smitty has second thoughts and decides to go home. Once there, Jeff goes to see Mr. Jepsen (William Lanteau) at an employment agency about a job. While there, Jeff meets just out of high school April Poston, who is also looking for a job. Jepsen cannot get him a job just for the weekend. April offers to have Jeff come over for dinner, but he says that would not be making it on his own. Jeff goes to a place called Tony's Pizza that Sandy said he goes to. Jeff does some street advertising for Tony's and fills the place with customers. Jeff gets paid and gives Sandy, who came by, a new lunch box. When he gets home, Donna tells Alex that there is something different about Jeff now.
168	16	"Just a Little Wedding"	Barry Shear	Barbara Avedon	January 3, 1963
The Stones are planning a simple wedding for Mary's friend Marcia Haversham (Brenda Scott) and her boyfriend Bob Parker (Robert Hogan). Marcia and Bob tell Donna that they have not heard from Marcia's mother, Binnie (Binnie Barnes), because she travels a lot. While in Paris, Binnie finally gets one of Marcia's telegrams about the wedding. Marcia and Mary are panicking because they heard from Binnie and they think she wants to stop the wedding. Marcia, Bob, Mary and Donna meet Binnie at the airport. They try to tell her the wedding is in two weeks and all the plans have been made. Donna uses a little reverse psychology to get Binnie to except Marcia getting married. Donna tells Alex that Binnie will be staying with them. When Binnie learns that the wedding will be in the house, she decides furniture will have to be rearranged. She also wants to invite a large amount of people. Alex is not happy. Donna tries to tells Binnie that things were supposed to be small. Binnie wants 120 people and a 12 piece orchestra. While at dinner, Bob finally confronts Binnie and reminds her that they wanted things simple. She gets up and goes outside. Bob says he will go apologize, but Marcia thinks he did the right thing. Donna talks to Binnie and while it is hard for her, Binnie comes to understand.
169	17	"A Woman's Place"	Andrew McCullough	Norm Liebmann & Ed Hass	January 10, 1963
Donna comes home from a women's meeting and tells the family that she was asked to run for city council. Donna has not decided what to do yet because she has a full time job running the household. Mary and Jeff say they are old enough to take care of things. Donna decides to run. It has been three days and the household is not running smoothly during Donna's absence. Margaret drives Donna home and Donna mentions how tired she is. She knows there is much more work to be done and she is only doing it because her family is so excited for her. Donna asks Alex to go to a meeting with her. Alex takes offense when Donna says all the other candidates are bringing their wives. Alex has a dream that Donna wins various political offices until she becomes President of the U.S. Alex is treated as First Lady. Alex wakes up quite angry. Donna tells him that he and the kids pushed her into running. Alex says that the family needs her. Donna decides she does not want to run after all.
170	18	"The Chinese Horse"	Gene Nelson	Paul West	January 17, 1963
Donna attends an auction of unclaimed freight at the railroad warehouse. Alex and Mary make fun of the things Donna has bought at previous auctions. An unknown woman gives Donna money and asks her to bid on a large Chinese horse. Donna wins the auction but the woman disappears. Donna brings the horse home. Jeff comes up with a wild theory about how it might have been smuggled into the country by criminals. There could be something stored inside the horse. The criminals needed someone else to buy it to keep the heat off of them. Donna becomes a little unnerved. Jeff, Mary and Alex laugh about it. When Jeff sees a man walking around the front of the house, the family becomes frightened. The man comes to the door, but it turns out he is at the wrong house. Donna wants Alex to take the horse back to the warehouse. The car's battery is dead because someone put pliers across the terminals. Officer Larson (Jerry Douglas) comes by because he saw the family in the garage in the dark. They invite Larson in and tell him about the horse. More strange things happen. A Bert Rafferty comes to the door claiming that the horse is his. The family laughs at how they let their imaginations get the best of them. But, that does not explain the woman at the auction. Questions are somewhat answered when Alex and Donna go out to a fancy restaurant. Paul Winchell as the Auctioneer. Joe Downing as Man. George DeNormand as Auction Guest.
171	19	"The New Look"	Andrew McCullough	Phil Davis	January 24, 1963
Mary returns from a date with Howard Benson (Yale Summers). Before he leaves, he tells Mary that she is wholesome and he shakes her hand. Mary comes in the house quite upset. Donna tells Mary that she is sure Howard meant it as a compliment. Mary says she does not want to be dull and will change. Alex suggests she ask other people first if they feel she is wholesome as well. Mary is even more upset when she finds all her friends also find her dependable and wholesome. Mary again talks to Donna and wants her suggestion as to how to change her looks. Mary fantasizes about all the boys flocking around her and her new flamboyant look. She decides flamboyant is not what she is looking for. Mary then fantasizes she has a sultry look and the boys are dazzled by her. She again says that is not the look for her. Donna convinces Mary that she is perfect just the way she is. The next date with Howard, he has many more exciting words to describe Mary. Allan Hunt as Bill.
172	20	"A Way of Her Own"	Andrew McCullough	Paul West	January 31, 1963
The Stones are playing football in the park when a little girl joins them. The girl follows the family home. Donna learns the girl's name is Trisha (Patty Petersen). Donna suggests that Trisha go home, but she says she will stay in the backyard. Trisha says she wants to be part of their family. They feed her lunch and then Jeff takes her back to the park and tells her to go home. But, Trisha returns to the house and calls Alex daddy. Trisha says she does not have a family. Donna starts to grow fond of her. Alex and Donna take Trisha back to the park again. Before they leave, Trisha sneaks into the back of the station wagon. This time they drop her off at the police station. But, she still makes it back to the house. Donna has Trisha put on one of Mary's dresses from when she was little. Alex starts to grow fond of Trisha as well. That evening Fred Hawley, Trisha's uncle, comes by the house to pick her up. Trisha goes and hides. He informs the Stones that her parents are dead and he has been taking care of her. But he travels a lot and he has a woman watch Trisha. As the family have all grown fond of her, they all decide that she could stay with the family for a couple weeks. Note: With this episode, Paul Peterson's real life sister joins the cast.
173	21	"Three Is a Family"	Andrew McCullough	Paul West	February 7, 1963
Trisha is now part of the family and fits in easily. Jeff enjoys playing with her, and Donna likes having another child to care for. But, Donna wonders what will happen after the agreed upon couple of weeks. What if her Uncle wants to take her back. Alex mentions to Donna there are only three bedrooms in the house. Where will they put Trisha. Donna says they will just put a cot in Mary's room. Mary reluctantly agrees. A problem arises when everyone might have plans for the evening and there is no one to watch Trisha. Mary volunteers to give up going out with Scotty (Jimmy Hawkins). Mary asks Scotty if he would not mind staying with her and watch Trisha. Mary hints to Scotty that she is having a little trouble adjusting to Trisha around. Trisha senses this and asks Mary why she does not like her. Trisha keeps getting out of bed and interrupting Mary and Scotty. Scotty has had enough and leaves. Mary and Trisha spend the rest of the evening together and things start to work out between the two girls. Donna and Alex come home and find the girls sleeping together.
174	22	"Big Sixteen"	Gene Nelson	Barbara Avedon	February 14, 1963
Jeff is upset that his girlfriend Joanne (Brooke Bundy) plans a pajama party on the same night as his sixteenth birthday party. Donna learns that Jeff did not tell Joanne that it was his birthday. Donna says that she could talk to Joanne, but Jeff tells her to stay out of it. Joanne talks to Donna about how her and Jeff have broken up. Donna hints around to Joanne that Jeff's birthday is coming up. Jeff comes home and he and Joanne wind up fighting. Donna thinks Jeff could have been more polite. Mary and her friend Jeanette are building a project. Jeanette goes to Jeff's room to borrow some wood glue. Jeanette tries to boost Jeff's ego a little. Donna tells Alex she is afraid Jeff is becoming a woman hater. But then they see Jeff all dressed up because Jeanette is staying for dinner. The next morning the family comments on how Jeff fawned over Jeanette. Joanne comes by and tells Donna she has been looking for Jeff. Donna lets it slip to Jeff and Smitty that Joanne came by. Jeff calls Joanne, but the two wind up being rude to each other. The night of the party, Jeff thinks that Jeanette is going to be his date. Mary tells Donna that Jeanette is coming with her boyfriend. Donna has to explain it to Jeff and now he does not feel like having the party. But, the party goes on and Jeff winds up picking up Joanne and bringing her to the party.
175	23	"Pioneer Woman"	Gene Nelson	Barbara Avedon	February 21, 1963
Alex and Jeff wake up early to go duck hunting with their friend Red (Jim Davis). Alex does everything he can to not wake up Donna. Donna does get up to make them breakfast. During breakfast, Red comments that women of today cannot go camping because they are too soft. He says women have too many modern conveniences. that is why he never married. To prove Red wrong, Donna tells him that her and Mary will meet them at the lodge. When the guys get to the cabin, Alex and Jeff see that it is quite modern. Red says he just likes teasing Donna. After running out of gas, Donna and Mary decide to hike to the cabin. They run into a Mountaineer (Hal K. Dawson) who gives them directions. While resting, Donna and Mary run into Roger Griffin and Wendy Simms who tell them the cabin is another mile away. Roger offers to drive them in his car, but Donna turns him down. They finally make it to a run down cabin that they believe the guys will be staying in. They spend the day trying to fix the place up. Meanwhile, Red still does not think Donna and Mary will show up. When night time comes, the girls realize they are in the wrong cabin. Worried about the girls, the guys search for them. When they find Donna and Mary in the old cabin and see how fixed up it is, Red apologizes to Donna. Donna learns that the men did not get any ducks. Later, Donna meets Red's new wife and she is far from a pioneer woman.
176	24	"The House on the Hill"	Gene Nelson	Barney Slater & Michael Cramoy	February 28, 1963
Donna and the Woman's Club are raising money for the children's clinic. Out of ideas for donations, Donna suggests someone visit Mrs. Sarah Allison (Kathryn Givney), the richest woman in town. Grace (Angela Greene) says that Mrs. Allison has not been seen in 25 years. Neither Grace nor Edie (Dorothy Lovett) are willing to go, so it is up to Donna. Jeff tells the family that he and his friends believe the house is haunted. Donna goes to the house and meets Sarah. Sarah at first turns Donna down. Then she wonders why no one has come before asking for a donation. Mrs. Allison says she will think about it and Donna should come back tomorrow. But, Donna cannot leave as her car will not start. Sarah says she does not have a phone, but she will send Eric the butler (Joe Downing) up the street to make a call. Time goes on and it is beginning to look as though Donna is intentionally being kept there. Alex comes by the house, but Pauline the maid tells him Donna is not there anymore. Donna sees Alex's car leave, but Eric says it was not him. When Alex gets home, he calls the police. Mrs. Allison insists that Donna spend the night. Eric finally admits to Donna that they have been keeping her at the house, but only because it seemed to bring life back to Mrs. Allison. Sarah agrees that she has been afraid to leave the house. The next day, a more out going Mrs. Allison pays a visit to Donna and brings a check for clinic.
177	25	"Where the Stones Are"	Gene Nelson	Seymour Friedman	March 7, 1963
Mary wants to vacation at Shelter Bay resort with her friends on spring break. Alex is against the idea because he has heard what goes on there. Donna and Alex reluctantly agree, but decide to secretly spy on her to make sure there are no problems. Alex tells Donna that he was able to borrow a friends large cabin cruiser for the week. Donna is not thrilled about living on a boat. Bonnie, Darla and Judy come by to pick up Mary for the trip. Donna is worried about running into Mary during the trip. Alex, Donna and Jeff arrive at Shelter Bay and not long after, Mary and her friends arrive. The family gets on the boat and Donna actually likes it. They then see Mary and her friends coming down the dock and they have to hide. The family heads out to do some fishing. Donna catches a large fish. As they are trying to reel it in, Mary and her friends come by on another boat. Alex, Donna and Jeff try and hide, but Mary sees them. The fish breaks off the line. By ships radio, Mary lets them know she saw them. Mary at first is very angry, but back at the dock Alex explains that it was all his idea and he was just worried about her. She forgives them, but they have to take her, her friends and their dates out on the boat that night. Note: Darla Banks, Miss Teenage America in 1962, appears as one of Mary's friends.
178	26	"The Two Doctors Stone"	Barry Shear	Barbara Avedon	March 14, 1963
Both Alex and Donna have had a rough day. Alex tells Donna that they should get away for the weekend, but Donna is hesitant to leave the children. Donna reluctantly agrees to go. The next morning, Alex tells the children about his and Donna's trip. Alex's friend Dr. Dave Blevins (Bob Crane) has access to a cottage near a golf course. Dave and his wife Carol will join Alex and Donna for the weekend. At the Children's Hospital, Donna thinks one of the boys is running a fever. After checking with a thermometer, Alex jokes about Donna's doctor skills. Donna gets angry, as Alex made the joke in front of Dave. Back at home, Donna is still mad at Alex. It takes some doing but Donna finally forgives him. That night, Alex tells Donna about going with Dave and Carol up to the cottage. Donna says she cannot go away for the weekend because she thinks Trisha is coming down with something. Donna has a very unscientific reason for how she feels and it has to do with Trisha eating a lot of bananas. Dave comes by and is told that Donna will not go on the trip. Alex gets Donna to tell Dave her reasoning. After watching Trisha for a few days, Donna decides it is OK to go to the cabin. The day they were to leave, Jeff says he does not feel well. It turns out to just be a head cold and the trip is still on. Alex and Donna find out why Trisha was eating so many bananas.
179	27	"Everywhere That Mary Goes"	Gene Nelson	Paul West	March 21, 1963
Donna and Alex are going out to dinner. Jeff tells Donna he found a sign that he can use to fix her flower box. It happens to be a for sale sign. Mary has her very shy new girlfriend Vinnie (Valora Noland) over to the house. Emory Peck (Jimmy Baird), a boy Mary danced with once but has no interest in, comes to the door. Mary does not want to talk to him, so she tries to get Vinnie to tell him she is not home. Vinnie cannot do it. When Mary cannot get Jeff to answer the door, Mary has to do it. Mary is quite rude to Emory and gets him to leave. Mistakenly thinking the Stone house is for sale, Lottie and Orville Bohmer come inside and start looking around. Once the misunderstanding is corrected, the Bohmers introduce their son Clovis to the family. He is a rather large country boy and will be going to Mary's college. Clovis is quite taken with Mary. At school, Vinnie tells Mary that she just does not know how to act around boys. Clovis comes by and after Mary introduces him to Vinnie, Vinnie abruptly leaves. It seems that every time Mary and Vinnie turn around, Emory or Clovis or both are around. And Clovis is always roughing up guys he thinks are being rude to Mary. Lottie tells Donna that all Clovis can talk about is Mary. Mary tells Clovis to leave her alone and it really hurts his feelings. Mary manages to get Clovis interested in Vinnie. Buddy Joe Hooker as Robbie.
180	28	"The Handy Man"	Andrew McCullough	Paul West	March 28, 1963
Donna hired a plumber who wound up making things worse. Other things are starting to fall apart around the house. Alex tells Donna to hire some competent people to fix everything. Meanwhile, Trisha and some of her friends have befriended Charlie Brubaker (Doodles Weaver), a handyman who likes to entertain children while he is working. Trisha tells Charlie that he should come by her house, because there is a lot that needs fixing there. The kids then go to see Mr. Fletcher, the ice cream truck man. Charlie comes by the house and Donna hires him. Donna's friend Gloria Simms (Eloise Hardt) comes by and tells her that Charlie is a handyman who is not so handy. But now, Donna cannot seem to fire Charlie even though he is destroying the house. Mr. Fletcher comes by and tells Donna that Charlie does not know what he is doing. Fletcher could fix everything, but he is just too busy. Donna tries to sweet talk him into helping her out. In the end, Mr. Fletcher and Charlie trade jobs.
181	29	"Friends and Neighbors"	Barry Shear	Barbara Avedon	April 4, 1963
It is late at night and someone is ringing the doorbell. It turns out to be Dave Kelsey (Bob Crane), Alex's pediatrician friend. Dave brings in a couple suitcases and his golf clubs. He is having a problem with his wife Midge (Ann McCrea) and his mother-in-law, Helen. The next morning Dave complains about having to live with his in-laws. He would like his own house. Donna mentions that the house next door might be for sale. Dave says that Midge does not want to leave Mommy and Daddy. Alex suggests Dave start being more assertive with Midge. This compels Dave to buy the house next door without telling Midge. Dave and Midge come by and she seems excited about the house. But then she says they do not need the house because they live with her parents. It takes some doing, but Donna talks Midge into moving out of her parents house. Midge does not know how to live without her mother's help. Donna winds up helping with everything from cooking to cleaning. The Kelseys will be hosting their first dinner for Alex and Donna. Alex makes Donna promise to not help. Midge actually did a good job by herself.
182	30	"Boys and Girls"	Barry Shear	Andy White	April 11, 1963
Mary is upset because she wants to entertain her college friends in the living room and Jeff wants to have his friend Joanne Wells (Mimsy Farmer) there. Jeff winds up having to study with Joanne in the kitchen. Mary's friend Jerry Scott (Jimmy Hawkins) asks Jeff if he will go and get some burgers. Jerry seems interested in Joanne. Mary comes in the kitchen with her other friends, Ted and Becky (Cheryl Miller). Jeff asks Joanne to the college dance. Mary plans to go with Jerry and she does not want Jeff to go. She thinks he will just embarrass her, because he and Joanne are still in High School. But when they get to the dance, it seems Jerry and Joanne only have eyes for each other. They spend the entire evening together. Mary winds up having to dance with Jeff. Jeff has been working around the house to earn some money. Jeff buys Joanne a gift which she says she cannot except as she is going to another dance with Jerry. Mary takes Jeff to the dance so they can keep an eye on Jerry and Joanne. Joanne comes to realize that she is not quite ready to be with a college boy. She goes back to Jeff and Mary dances with Jerry.
183	31	"All Those Dreams"	Gene Nelson	Barbara Avedon	April 18, 1963
Jeff dreams that Don Drysdale refuses to pitch a game unless Jeff catches for him. Donna and Jeff are going to accompany Alex to Chicago where he has a medical conference. Jeff is going along because Drysdale is playing a baseball game there at the same time. The three can barely fit in the car with all the things they promised to drop off for friends who have relatives in Chicago. Jeff promised a lot of his friends that he would get Drysdale to autograph baseballs for them. At the hotel, Jeff tries calling Drysdale at the ballpark. He is unable to get in touch with Don and is disappointed. Jeff even goes to the ballpark, with no luck. He thinks Drysdale is avoiding him. Donna is busy trying to get a hold of the people she is supposed to bring things to. Donna says that Jeff shouldn't run away from disappointment, but he decides to take a bus home. Mr. Morton (Paul Winchell) of the hotel asks Alex if he can look in on a sick child. The child turns out to be Don Drysdale's little girl. Alex brings Don back to see Jeff, but learn he has already left. Jeff comes back saying he was going to take Donna's advice and is surprised to see Don. Back at home, Jeff is excited to see his interview with Don published in the local paper. Note: Don's real life wife Ginger and daughter Kelly appear.
184	32	"All Women Are Dangerous"	Barry Shear	Phil Davis	April 25, 1963
Jeff and Smitty are at the malt shop and are looking forward to an upcoming jazz concert and dance. Joyce (Lori Martin) and Sabrina (Janet Landgard) are there as well. They each believe they can get Jeff to ask them to the dance and the competition is on. Sabrina comes over to help Jeff with his homework. She proceeds to compliment him and flirt with him. Just as Jeff is about to ask Sabrina to the dance, Joyce shows up. After getting Sabrina to leave, Joyce proceeds to charm Jeff. Just as Jeff is about to ask Joyce to the dance, Sabrina calls and needs Jeff to help her find her school books. Jeff likes both of them and has a hard time deciding which girl to take. Back at the malt shop, Smitty suggests that Jeff just toss a coin. The girls are there and again compete for Jeff. Jeff does not know what to do and leaves. Jeff asks Alex, Donna and Mary what he should do. They each separately tell him to toss a coin. Jeff talks to Gwen about which girl to ask. She tells him to toss a coin. Without him knowing it, Gwen manipulates Jeff into asking her to the dance. Smitty winds up dancing with Joyce and Sabrina. When Jeff gets home, something Mary says makes him realize that Gwen tricked him into taking her.
185	33	"The Big Wheel"	Barry Shear	Barbara Avedon	May 2, 1963
Donna and Mary are decorating the backyard for a formal party for Mary's friends that night. Meanwhile, Jeff wants a vehicle of his own and he manages to talk Alex into it. He buys a very old city bus. Alex asks Jeff if he has any idea how much it will cost to maintain the bus. Jeff has the idea he can charge his friends when they need to go somewhere. After he parks it out front of the house he finds that he cannot get it moving again. Mary is worried about her party and she does not want the presence of the ugly old bus ruining it. Jeff leaves to take his scholarship exam. People start boarding the bus. Donna has to explain to them that the bus is not in service. Mary's friend Howard (Yale Summers) tries to get the bus started. When that does not work, Donna suggests having it towed. The tow truck cannot move the bus and gets stuck. Mary wants to cancel the party. A second tow truck tries to move the two vehicles, but cannot. The tow trucks finally get separated, but the bus is still there. Donna suggests having the party in the front yard and in the bus. The party is a hit. The next day Jeff trades the bus for an old police car...with a constantly ringing siren.
186	34	"Day of the Hero"	Barry Shear	Phil Davis	May 9, 1963
Jeff asks Rosemary Wilson to the senior prom and she accepts. Smitty tells Jeff he has been nominated for class president and his date will be crowned queen of the ball. Dolores, one of the prettiest girls at school, calls Jeff up and congratulates him on being nominated. She invites him over to her house. Now, Jeff can only think of Dolores. Rosemary tells Jeff about the dress she got for the prom. Smitty helps Jeff campaign for class president. Jeff asks Dolores to the prom, forgetting that he already asked Rosemary. Jeff asks Smitty to tell Rosemary and Smitty finally agrees. Later Smitty tells Jeff he could not do it. Unsure what to do, Jeff asks Donna for advice and she tells him to break it off with Dolores because he already asked Rosemary. However, Jeff tells Rosemary he cannot take her to the prom and she runs off crying. Smitty tells Jeff he lost the class president election by one vote. Dolores tells Jeff she will not go to the prom with him because she really was only interested in him just to be crowned prom queen. Jeff apologizes to Rosemary, and while she is mad at him at first, she does forgive him. But she now rebukes his offer to be his date for the prom.

=== Season 6 (1963–64) ===
No. overall	No. in season	Title	Directed by	Written by	Original release date
187	1	"The Playmate"	Gene Nelson	Barney Slater	September 19, 1963
Trisha's friend Nancy is being spoiled by her grandfather (Stuart Erwin) with too many presents so her parents forbid her getting anymore. But the grandfather decides to involve the Stones by sending the gifts for Nancy to their house.
188	2	"Brighten the Corner"	Unknown	Unknown	September 26, 1963
Trisha decorates the living room wall and then Donna finds out that Alex invited company over for dinner. Note: Beginning with this episode, Bob Crane (as Dr. David Kelsey) and Ann McCrea (as Midge Kelsey, David's wife) became regular cast members.
189	3	"Whatever You Wish"	Andrew McCullough	Paul West	October 3, 1963
A wealthy woman (Jean Engstrom) offers Jeff whatever he wishes to show her gratitude after he saves her little girl's life. Whit Bissell appears as Mr. Herbert. Note: Dean Martin's daughter, Claudia, makes her acting debut in this episode.
190	4	"House Divided"	Unknown	Unknown	October 10, 1963
A weekend in a mountain cabin with the Kelseys sounds ideal. Donna and Alex have second thoughts when they start thinking of all the practical details.
191	5	"The Boys in 309"	Unknown	Unknown	October 17, 1963
After much coaxing, Jeff finally gets Donna's permission to play high school football – as long as he does not actually carry the ball.
192	6	"The Bigger They Are"	Unknown	Unknown	October 24, 1963
The stranger in the Stones' backyard is from the Bureau of Highways. He is measuring the area for a new thruway. Jacques Aubuchon appears as Big Juley. Peter Leeds appears as Gaston.
193	7	"It Grows on Trees"	Unknown	Unknown	October 31, 1963
Jeff, who needs money to pay for the various damages he has inflicted on the house, decides to go into business for himself by selling unsellable trees.
194	8	"Mary Comes Home"	Gene Nelson	Ben Gershman & Milton Pascal	November 7, 1963
The family gets a letter from Mary saying she will be coming home from college for the weekend. Everyone is excited and starts getting things ready in the house. Midge calls Donna and invites her to do some things this weekend, but Donna says Mary will be in town. Mary arrives and just as she is about to tell the family some things, she gets a phone call from one of her friends. She then gets another phone call. Mary finally gets off the phone. The family is about to have lunch when a bunch of Mary's friends stop by. Donna invites the friends to stay for lunch. Every time the family plans to do something together, Mary goes off with her friends. Mary promises she will spend this evening with the family. Mary later comes back and says the family has been invited to one of her friends parties. Alex says they were supposed to be together that night and Mary says they still will be. Donna and Alex are disappointed, but they agree to go. Jeff confronts Mary and tells her how hurt their parents are. He says they really wanted to spend one evening alone with her. Jeff tells her all the things they had planned. Mary, in tears, apologizes to her parents. She decides to stay home with the family. Donna Corcoran as Claudia.
195	9	"Post Time"	Unknown	Unknown	November 14, 1963
All Alex wants from Jeff is a simple explanation: Why did he receive a bill for over $500 for marching-band uniforms? Jeff depends on a horse to get the class out of debt and himself out of trouble. George Chandler appears as Uncle Charlie.
196	10	"Sweet Mystery of Wife"	Unknown	Unknown	November 21, 1963
Alex receives a special delivery letter at breakfast. He hurriedly stuffs it in his pocket and spends the rest of the day dodging Donna's hints about it.
197	11	"What Are Friends For?"	Barry Shear	Barbara Avedon	November 28, 1963
Donna finds Smitty cleaning Jeff's room, which is something Jeff was supposed to do. Smitty claims he does not mind helping a friend. But after something that Donna says, Smitty is getting tired of being used by Jeff. Meanwhile, a Dr. Carter is coming to town for a conference and Alex would like Jeff to entertain the doctor's daughter, Amy. Jeff says he asked Caroline out for that night, but she said she has to think about it. Alex insists Jeff go with Amy. At school, Jeff and Smitty are still playing indifferent to each other. Caroline comes by and tells Jeff she agrees to go out with him. Jeff now tries to find someone else to go on the blind date with Amy. Jeff smooth talks Smitty into going out with Amy. Smitty also has to pretend to be Jeff on the date. The night of the date, Jeff comes home and tells Alex that everything went fine with Amy. The next day, Jeff and Smitty come to the Stone house and are surprised to see Amy and her father there. The boys try to continue to pull off their charade. Alex is a little confused. Donna sees through it, but plays along. The next day Smitty tells Donna not to be mad at Jeff, because he really is a great friend. Donna later finds another one of Jeff's friends doing his work for him.
198	12	"A Touch of Glamor"	Barry Shear	Erna Lazarus	December 5, 1963
"A Touch of Glamour" is too much for Alex. When he sees Donna modeling an expensive gown at a fashion show, he buys it for her. Myrna Dell appears as a Saleswoman. Steven Geray appears as Herbert. Sheila Kuehl appears as a Model. Alice Pearce appears as Adele Collins.
199	13	"Air Date"	Andrew McCullough	Paul West	December 12, 1963
Jeff and his friends start a club using their walkie talkies to communicate. One day, another voice intrudes on their conversations, a girl who will not give her name. This drives Jeff to find out who she might be, anxiously looking around at school, but no luck. Eventually, Jeff and Smitty use a radio wave locator to find her. Peter Duryea appears as a Delivery Man.
200	14	"Moon-Shot"	Unknown	Unknown	December 19, 1963
Mary returns for a visit just in time to help Jeff retreat from an embarrassing position in his "fund raising" campaign. John Banner appears as Cruikshank.
201	15	"Nice Work"	Unknown	Unknown	December 26, 1963
Jeff has invited a girl to the chic Candlelight Ball, but his allowance will not stand the strain. Fay Baker appears as Mrs. Winters.
202	16	"First Addition"	Unknown	Unknown	January 2, 1964
Sam Jaffe appears in a cameo role as Donna reminisces about Mary's birth.
203	17	"The Combo"	Unknown	Unknown	January 9, 1964
The combo Jeff has organized may not be good, but they are loud. Nobody wants to be around when the boys start playing.
204	18	"Who's Rockin' the Partnership"	Barry Shear	Ben Gershman & Milton Pascal	January 16, 1964
Jeff and Smitty feud over a money-raising project.
205	19	"Something Funny Happened on the Way to the Altar"	Barry Shear	Barbara Avedon	January 23, 1964
Dave and Midge have a minor disagreement and decide to reminisce about how they met. They have differing versions of how they met on a blind date. Donna's part in setting them up and the months before their wedding are relived.
206	20	"Today I Am a Girl"	Barry Shear	Phil Sharp	January 30, 1964
Trisha is used to being a tomboy and hanging out with the neighborhood guys. Suddenly her pals decide to exclude her from their fishing club and Donna must console her while explaining things to the young girl.
207	21	"Will the Real Chicken Please Stand Up?"	Unknown	Unknown	February 6, 1964
Donna and Midge grow nervous at the prospect of taking their driving tests. William Lanteau appears as Simmons.
208	22	"Guest in the Nursery"	Paul Nickell	Milton Pascal & Ben Gershman	February 13, 1964
Dave Kelsey finds a fawn on the roadside and gives it to Trish as a gift. She quickly becomes attached to it which makes it hard for Donna and Alex to tell her she must give it up.
209	23	"Home Sweet Homemaker"	Unknown	Unknown	February 20, 1964
Dave causes himself a huge problem on the home front when he tells Midge he likes Donna's cooking better. Donna becomes part of a rivalry she wants no part of.
210	24	"Teamwork"	Unknown	Unknown	February 27, 1964
Dr. Dave is not getting around to the little chores around the house, frustrating Midge. Trisha and her friends decide take on the jobs but Trisha notices Dave just wants to golf with his free time. She has an idea to make Midge happy. Billy Booth appears as Petey. Peter Robbins appears as Peewee.
211	25	"Neither a Borrower Nor a Lender Be"	Gene Nelson	Tommy Tomlinson	March 5, 1964
Donna makes a loan to Midge of $13.26 but Midge does not seem to be in a hurry to pay it back. Donna drops hints and reminders but fears ruining the friendship if she asks for it back directly.
212	26	"Pandemonium in the Condominium"	Unknown	Unknown	March 12, 1964
Alex and Donna have a differing opinion about a financial matter. Donna wants to replace the old washing machine and Alex desires a set of golf clubs. Neither is willing to budge to break the impasse.
213	27	"A Day for Remembering"	Unknown	Unknown	March 19, 1964
At Jeff's high school graduation, Donna begins to reminisce about some of his escapades as a youngster.
214	28	"One Little Word"	Unknown	Unknown	March 26, 1964
Pinnifink! Alex keeps muttering the word in his sleep; Donna wants an explanation.
215	29	"Love Letters Are for Burning"	Unknown	Unknown	April 2, 1964
Nancy (Kathleen Crowley), an old girlfriend of Dave's, decides to write a book based on his love letters. Midge is not happy and Dave tries to change his former flame's mind.
216	30	"Four's a Crowd"	Unknown	Unknown	April 9, 1964
The Stones and Kelseys decide separately they are spending too much time together. But in trying to develop separate interests the couples are miserable avoiding each other.
217	31	"My Son the Catcher"	Unknown	Unknown	April 16, 1964
Jeff wins laurels for his baseball playing and is immediately pounced on by a number of college scouts. The family advises him on how to respond to the pressure. Willie Mays appears as himself. Don Drysdale appears as himself. William Bramley appears as Harvey Jay.
218	32	"The Pros and the Cons"	Unknown	Unknown	April 23, 1964
Donna and Midge resent being "Golf Widows" every Saturday afternoon. They decide to take up golf so they can spend more time with their husbands. Alex and Dave are less than thrilled with the idea, so they try to discourage them.

=== Season 7 (1964–65) ===
No. overall	No. in season	Title	Directed by	Written by	Original release date
219	1	"Operation Anniversary"	Fred de Cordova	Story by : Frank Crow; Teleplay by : Tommy Tomlinson	September 17, 1964
Jeff makes a lamp out of an old water pump for Dr. Dave Kelsey (Bob Crane) and Midge (Ann McCrea). Jeff wants to make his parents' anniversary special with a surprise fancy dinner out. Jeff calls the restaurant and learns that he does not have enough money for the type of dinner he wanted. He is able to work something out with the restaurant. Donna tells Jeff that Alex made plans to go away for that weekend. Dave and Midge suggest that Jeff make his parents something instead. Jeff decides to make them a lamp and works on it in Dave's garage. Donna notices a light going on and off in the garage. Alex tells Dave that there is a prowler in the garage. The Kelseys let it slip to Alex and Donna that Jeff had made plans for their anniversary. Alex and Donna tell Jeff that they are canceling their trip. Jeff has a problem now as he does not have the money for the dinner. Dave finds a way for Jeff to get the money by selling the lamp he was making for his parents. The night of the anniversary, Jeff drives his parents to the fancy restaurant. He joins them for dinner to make sure everything goes well. When they get home, the lamp that Jeff had made and sold is in the house. Eugene Borden as the Headwaiter.
220	2	"Dad Drops By"	Gene Reynolds	Phil Sharp	September 24, 1964
Alex's colorful father Samuel is coming for a visit. At the last minute Alex is called away to help with a medical problem upstate. Samuel is driving his prized 1928 Deusenberg, which runs into a fender-bender with Midge's parked car. He wants to get a lawyer and sue whoever owns the car. His eccentric ways are also taking some getting used to. Donna and Jeff decide to prove the accident was actually his fault, due to his erratic driving by secretly filming him on a drive through town. They play the film for him and he sees how badly he really drives. He decides to sell the car to an auto museum.
221	3	"Play Ball"	Gene Nelson	Sam Locke & Joel Rapp	October 1, 1964
Donna and Midge are trying to figure out what kind of benefit they can run to help raise money for the hospital. Jeff suggests that the Doctors baseball team play his freshman college team. Alex does not think that is a good idea as he is still sore from the last game he played. At the hospital Willie Mays and Don Drysdale stop by with some autographed baseballs for the benefit. Alex and Dave tell Jeff they have reconsidered playing Jeff's team. But, Jeff finds out that they have recruited Willie and Don. Leo Durocher shows up to take Don to training camp and Donna and Midge talk him into umpiring the game. The game is pretty one sided with the pros playing on the doctor team. Donna asks Don and Willie if there is something they can do to give the freshman team a chance. Don and Willie argue with Umpire Leo in hopes of getting kicked out of the game. Leo almost kicks them out, until he realizes that is how he acts with umpires. Leo decides to stop umpiring and play on the doctor's team.
222	4	"Who's Who on 202?"	Unknown	Unknown	October 8, 1964
Donna's routine takes her out of the city and driving down an isolated rural road. Her car breaks down where an escaped prisoner is thought to be, leaving Donna to think fast in unusual circumstances. Richard Conte guest stars.
223	5	"The Daughter Complex"	Unknown	Unknown	October 15, 1964
Mary arrives home from college where she just received an honor in a psychology class she is taking. She starts noticing every quirk and habit of her family and decides to share her textbook analysis to their dismay. Louis Quinn appears as Jerry.
224	6	"The Tycoons"	Barry Shear	Unknown	October 22, 1964
Alex does so well on his first stock investment that Dave decides to try his luck at "playing the market".
225	7	"Instant Family"	Unknown	Unknown	October 29, 1964
Midge and Dave, who are childless, agree to watch the Stone kids while their parents are out of town. Things start off smoothly but then things go awry.
226	8	"Royal Flush"	Gene Reynolds	Paul West	November 5, 1964
The town rolls out the red carpet for two hobos who are posing as Russian royalty. Vito Scotti appears as Prince Georgivani. Maxie Rosenbloom appears as Max.
227	9	"Circumstantial Evidence"	Unknown	Unknown	November 12, 1964
Alex claims that Donna is keeping pictures of her former boy friend around the house.
228	10	"Anyone Can Drive?"	Unknown	Unknown	November 19, 1964
When Jeff tries to teach his girl friend Karen to drive, Mary recalls what happened when her boy friend Scotty attempted the same feat.
229	11	"Surprise, Surprise"	Unknown	Unknown	November 26, 1964
Alex and Dave try to throw a surprise party for Midge. But the girls manage to keep two steps ahead on all their plans.
230	12	"Quads of Trouble"	Fred de Cordova	Mannie Manheim & Erna Lazarus	December 3, 1964
A taxi driver delivers an expectant mother to Alex's office and he delivers the babies. Pandemonium reigns in the Stone household after quadruplets are born. Bing Russell appears as Bill Gayley.
231	13	"Donna's Bank Account"	Barry Shear	Keith Fowler & Phil Leslie	December 10, 1964
After bragging to husband Alex how well she handles money Donna learns she is overdrawn. Donna tries to cover up the problem before Alex finds out.
232	14	"It's All in the Cards"	Barry Shear	Leonard Gershe	December 17, 1964
Midge claims to be able to tell the future by reading cards. Alex scoffs at the idea but cannot explain when her predictions start coming true.
233	15	"Old Faithful"	Fred de Cordova	Barbara Avedon	December 24, 1964
Mary comes home from college and expects to pick up with Scotty after so much time. Mary is indignant and a little hurt when she finds out Scotty, who she always had to fall back on, has a new girlfriend.
234	16	"Overture in A-Flat"	Unknown	Unknown	December 31, 1964
Jeff and Smitty decide to show how independent they are and get an apartment near college, complete with hangers-on. They both quickly learn about adult responsibility and how much growing up they still have to do.
235	17	"Thy Name is Woman"	Gene Nelson	Ben Starr	January 7, 1965
Donna is floating on air while Midge suffers a blow to her self-confidence after a stranger flirts with Donna at a restaurant.
236	18	"Joe College"	Alan Rafkin	Barbara Avedon	January 14, 1965
After being forced to retire, Alex's irascible father moves in with the Stones and enrolls in the local college where he enthusiastically jumps into all activities enjoyed by the average college freshman. Jeff in decidedly unhappy about being in the same class as his grandfather. Leonard Stone appears as Harlan Carmody Jr. Note: Carl Betz plays a dual role as Alex and Dad.
237	19	"Painter Go Home"	Andrew McCullough	Paul West	January 21, 1965
Donna hires a painter who gets so involved with the family, that he barely has time to paint the living and dining rooms. John Fiedler appears as Fred Johnson. Nora Marlowe appears as Mrs. Gooch.
238	20	"Home Wreckonomics"	Alan Rafkin	Sam Locke & Joel Rapp	January 28, 1965
Jeff's girlfriend Karen (Janet Landgard) takes over the Kelseys' household for a week as an assignment in home economics, much to Dave's chagrin.
239	21	"The Windfall"	Unknown	Unknown	February 4, 1965
Jeff buys a supposedly empty suitcase at a public auction and is surprised to find $500 inside. He is in a quandary whether to quietly keep it or track down the owner.
240	22	"Now You See It, Now You Don't"	Gene Nelson	Richard Conway & Roland MacLane	February 11, 1965
After Midge borrows the family car for a shopping trip, its rear fender disappears. Donna and Midge try to get the car fixed before Alex gets home. Buster Keaton appears as Mr. Turner, a car repairman.
241	23	"The Gift Shop"	Gene Nelson	Paul West	February 18, 1965
Jeff finds things less than routine when he takes a part-time job in an old-fashioned gift shop. But then he begins to appreciate a different generation's way of doing things. Ellen Corby appears as Christine Moss. June Ellis appears as Emaline Rose. Peter Hobbs appears as Frank Robbins. Nydia Westman appears as Mrs. Robbins.
242	24	"The Stamp Collector"	Andrew McCullough	Sam Locke & Joel Rapp	February 25, 1965
Alex has been teasing Donna about her trading-stamp collection. Alex then finds the perfect putter in the trading stamps store. Donna has five books of stamps that she was saving for a new pressure cooker, but the putter costs ten books. Can the family get the rest of the stamps in time for Alex to get the new putter to use in an upcoming golf tournament?
243	25	"Peacocks on the Roof"	Andrew McCullough	Paul West	March 4, 1965
Donna and the Kelseys become worried that Alex is overworked when he claims he saw a deer in the yard. He later states that a bear was in Dr. Kelsey's waiting room leading to even more questions about his mental state.
244	26	"Guests, Guests, Who Needs Guests? (a.k.a. Guests, Guests Who Wants Them?)"	Unknown	Unknown	March 11, 1965
Jeff is smitten with Louise (Marlo Thomas), the Kelseys' attractive yet abrasive god-daughter who is visiting from New York. He practically establishes residence at the Kelseys.
245	27	"The Unheroic Hero"	Unknown	Unknown	March 18, 1965
Jeff has everyone believing that his friend Walter Gordon is responsible for saving a little girl's dog, making Walter into a celebrity. The boys then have to worry about the truth coming out. Valora Noland appears as Wendy.
246	28	"The Mysterious Smile"	Unknown	Unknown	March 25, 1965
Jeff is excited about going out with the attractive Lisa Bridges (Cheryl Miller). He sends her an invitation to the ski lodge dance, but the invitation arrives at Katy Dalton's (Kim Darby) home instead. Jeff then has to think of a way to gracefully break the date. Barry Atwater appears as Mr. Dalton.
247	29	"The Rolling Stones"	Unknown	Unknown	April 1, 1965
The Stones and the Kelseys think that being good friends means they can survive going boating together. However, they encounter several unexpected difficulties. Aron Kincaid appears as Charlie.
248	30	"Indoor Outing"	Fred de Cordova	Milton Pascal	April 8, 1965
Trisha has come down with the measles and must miss the family fishing trip. While Alex and Jeff are away on the trip, Donna entertains and cheers up Trisha by recounting some of the trips the family has gone on in the past via flashbacks from various episodes. Note: Bob Crane's last appearance as Dr. Dave Kelsey.

=== Season 8 (1965–66) ===
No. overall	No. in season	Title	Directed by	Written by	Original release date
249	1	"Pop Goes Theresa"	Andrew McCullough	Paul West	September 16, 1965
Alex and Donna are going out for the evening and Jeff is playing in a basketball game. They must now find someone on short notice to baby sit Trisha. Alex remembers that a Brad Marshall (Warren Stevens), on the next block, has a teenage daughter Theresa (Tisha Sterling). Donna says his name sounds familiar. When Brad drops Theresa off, he seems to have a problem with Jeff. After Brad leaves, Jeff asks Theresa out for various things and she turns him down each time. The following Monday, Jeff goes to the Glen-Mar school for Girls that Theresa attends. Jeff wants to walk her home, but then Brad pulls up to drive her. Jeff now realizes that Theresa does not get out much because of her overly protective father. Later, she calls Jeff and asks him to meet her the next day. After Jeff picks up Theresa, he learns that she is quite the free spirit. Jeff takes Theresa to a pizza parlor where she and eventually all the kids cause a commotion. Everyone is brought to the police station. Donna and Brad arrive. Theresa admits that she started the commotion, but Brad thinks Jeff is the trouble maker. Donna suddenly remembers who Brad is. They went to the same college and Brad was quite the trouble maker. Donna makes Brad realize that every boy is not like he was back then. Brad offers to treat all the kids to pizza. He then remembers a stunt Donna pulled in college. Milton Frome as Desk Sergeant. Karl Lukas as Police Officer. Jimmy Hawkins as Scotty. Janet Landgard as Karen. Darryl Richard as Smitty.
250	2	"With This Ring"	Lawrence Dobkin	Don Richman & Janet Carlson	September 23, 1965
Jeff shows Donna and Midge Kelsey (Ann McCrea) some pictures of girlfriend Cynthia Collins. there is also a picture of Donna. Midge comments on the detail of the picture and how clear Donna's wedding ring is. Donna mentions that the ring is a family heirloom that is over 150 years old. Donna then notices her ring is not on her finger. Donna thinks she may have left it in Jeff's photo darkroom. Trisha puts Donna's smock away and the ring falls into a shoe on the floor. Donna recalls how Alex announced to his parents that he and Donna were engaged. She got the ring from Mother Stone (Jean Vander Pyl). When Alex finds out the ring is lost, he is not upset. He then recalls when they went out to dinner to celebrate the engagement. The waiter (Jamie Farr) kept bringing them expensive items they did not order. Turns out Alex's parents paid for it all. Meanwhile, Jeff takes a picture of the ring to Mr. Martindale (Jonathan Hole), the jeweler, to see if he can get another one like it. Alex sees Jeff and Cynthia coming out of the store and believes he was there to get an engagement ring for her. Jeff tells Donna what he was up to with the ring. While she really appreciated what Jeff wanted to do, she says there is no replacing the memories. Donna tells a panicked Alex what Jeff was up to. Alex buys Donna a new ring. Donna finds the old ring and hides it, but does not tell Alex. When Alex finds the old ring, he has Donna wear it instead of the new one.
251	3	"Boy Meets Girl Machine"	E. W. Swackhamer	Paul West	September 30, 1965
At school, Scotty shows Jeff "Herman the computer", that was from the electronics lab. Jeff tells Donna that he is concerned because he got a note stating Dean Whittaker (Robert Ellenstein) wanted to see him in his office the next morning. Jeff goes to see the Dean and it turns out that he would like Jeff to co-chair the "freshmen-sophomore get acquainted dance" at school. Jeff is hesitant at first, until he meets his other co-chair, freshman Bernice Barnes (Candy Moore). However, Jeff learns that Bernice likes to call all the shots. They need to pair up freshman with sophomores. Problems soon arise when a lot of the students complain about who they are set up with. Scotty suggests that they let Herman the computer do the matching up. Jeff likes the idea and he makes it look as though Bernice OK'd it. When they start collecting information for the computer cards, many of the students exaggerate things. Jeff is starting to get little annoyed with Bernice still giving all the orders. When they try to run the cards through the computer, it blows a fuse in Jeff's house. Jeff has had enough of Bernice and makes her go home. She says he could at least have kissed her good night. Alex and Donna see on TV that they are covering the dance and the computer's picks. Herman's picks do not seem to be any better than before. Jeff and Bernice get paired up and are actually happy about it.
252	4	"Think Mink"	Lawrence Dobkin	David Braverman & Bob Marcus	October 7, 1965
Donna and Midge are at the Ladies League Luncheon. Mrs. Randall (Molly Dodd) reminds them about their tickets for a raffle to win a mink coat. One of the tickets is the winner, but because they did not divvy up the tickets, Donna and Midge must share the coat. Alex and Jeff come home and see Donna in the mink. Alex wants to know what it cost. Donna and Midge explain to Alex they won it and they will each get the coat on alternate days. One day the coat is not in the closet where it should be. The women think it has been stolen, until they see Trisha wearing it. Mrs. Bellflower (Virginia Vincent) comes by with the tickets to the charity dinner. Dave cannot make the dinner, so the two ladies go together with Alex. They agree that Donna will wear the coat there and Midge will wear it back. At the dinner, Donna checks the coat. When Midge tries to get the mink from the coat check at the end of the evening, the coat check woman thinks Midge is trying to steal the coat. Mr. Hodges (Dick Wilson), the manager, questions Midge and then calls security. Alex and Donna come back from the car just in time. The girls decide to trade the coat in for two mink jackets. Alex goes to the furrier and buys the original coat thinking he is getting a second one, so the girls do not have to share. Alex and Dave wind up donating the coat to the next Ladies League raffle. Kirk Alyn as Man.
253	5	"Four on the Floor"	E. W. Swackhamer	Paul West	October 14, 1965
Jeff gets his parents to agree to let him buy his own car. Scotty drives Jeff over to Karen's house. She shows them a gold necklace that her Grandmother sent her from New York. Jeff tells her that he is going to buy a car from Henshaw's car lot. Karen says that Mr. Henshaw (Laurence Haddon) is her uncle. Karen calls her uncle and asks him to help Jeff pick out a good car and give him a deal. Thinking he knows everything about autos, Jeff ignores the advice of Henshaw and Scotty and buys an old car that has not been checked out. After Jeff shows the car to Karen, it immediately breaks down. The convertible top goes half way up by itself. Scotty drives by and teases Jeff about the car. Karen notices she has lost her necklace and goes in her house. It starts to rain and Jeff gets soaked. Jeff searches the car and does not find Karen's necklace. Karen calls her uncle and she tells Jeff that he is willing to take the car back. Jeff will not do it as it will prove that he was wrong to buy it in the first place. Jeff manages to get the car home and he tells Alex how bad he feels that he did not listen to Henshaw. Alex takes a look under the hood and sees what the trouble is. Alex does not tell Jeff what it is, but has him look to see if Jeff can find it himself. Jeff finds Karen's necklace and it was shorting out some electrical wiring. The car now runs fine.
254	6	"Charge"	Jerrold Bernstein	Sam Locke & Joel Rapp	October 21, 1965
Trisha is taking care of Samantha, a friends pet monkey. Donna applies for a credit card at Leslie's department store and is denied. Donna goes and speaks to Mr. Nelson (Arch Johnson), the credit manager of the store. It turns out that the store's computer shows that the Stones have never charged anything and thus have no credit history. Donna decides to prove a point by creating a fictional person named Samantha Simian and establishes credit all around town for the monkey. Donna even gets a credit card for the monkey from Leslie's. Donna takes Samantha to Leslie's and charges something with the monkey's credit card. Mr. Nelson says there must be some mistake, but Donna says she was told computers do not make mistakes. Nelson begs Donna to give him Samantha's card, but Donna says she will only do it if she gets a credit card. Nelson says he cannot do that. Samantha's story gets in the newspaper. Nelson hears a news report over the radio about Samantha's credit card and how Leslie's department store issued it. Nelson gets a call from Mr. Leslie, the owner. Leslie wants Donna to be issued a card. Nelson thinks he has Donna in a bind when the check she wrote to pay Samantha's bill bounces. Donna calls the bank and they tell Nelson that their computer blew a fuse and bounced several people's checks by mistake. In the end, Mr. Nelson is shown that computers are not always right and Donna will get her credit card.
255	7	"Do Me a Favor, Don't Do Me Any Favors"	Lawrence Dobkin	Joel Rapp & Sam Locke	October 28, 1965
The family watches on TV Professor James Caldwell (Lloyd Corrigan) making a speech about how he is being forced to retire. He wishes he could turn back the clock and stay. But, in actuality, he is happy about it. Because they knew him, Jeff and Alex are upset. They decide to start a petition to reinstate Caldwell. Jeff calls Dean Shelby and Alex tells the Dean about all the signatures they got for the petition. Dean Shelby tells Alex that they can present their case to the Board of Directors at the next meeting that evening. Meanwhile, Caldwell is planning all the things he is going to do now that he is retired. Mrs. Larson (Mary Treen), Caldwell's housekeeper, finds out about the petition and tells him. Caldwell is not happy. Caldwell speaks to Donna and asks her to have Jeff and Alex stop collecting signatures. He confesses that despite loving his job, he really wants to retire. After Donna talks to Alex, he still thinks that Caldwell wants his job back. Alex talks to Caldwell and realizes he wants to retire. Alex and Donna are not in time to stop Jeff from presenting his case for reinstatement to the Board of Directors. But, Alex tells the Board that he did speak to Caldwell and the Professor wants to retire. Caldwell also shows up to say the same thing.
256	8	"Author, Author"	Jerrold Bernstein	Barbara Avedon	November 4, 1965
Jeff gives his parents and Midge career aptitude tests. Turns out Alex should be a doctor. Midge thought she would score high in music, but did not. Donna's results shows she has literary talent. The family teases Donna about being an author and she gets annoyed. Midge tries to talk Donna into starting to write something. Donna has no interest, but then she finds a typewriter in the attic. She still puts it off and Midge keeps working on her. Donna finally agrees to give it a shot. That evening the family notices there is no dinner made. Midge comes by with some food and Alex wonders what Donna's been doing all day. Midge lets something slip and the family figures Donna was writing. The family finds Donna's manuscript in the attic. They discover that she is writing about them and some of their faults. They now try to be better and change their bad habits. Donna senses that they looked at what she had written and tells Midge. Donna does some more writing. She is hoping they will sneak another peek at her writing and decides to have a little fun with them.
257	9	"Trees"	Andrew McCullough	Nathaniel Curtis	November 11, 1965
Trisha tells Donna that there is a man out front by their tree. Donna confronts Mr. Swanson (Karl Lukas), the tree trimmer. City Commissioner Timothy 'Tiger' Trimmitt ((Paul Reed)) is there as well and he tells her the tree will be cut down the next day. Donna decides to fight city hall. She has to jump through a lot of hoops just to see Trimmitt. Trimmitt would like everyone on Elm Street to have an elm tree. Donna organizes the women on Elm Street to help her cause. All the ladies go to Trimmit's office to confront him, but he will not back down. The Mayor tells Trimmitt to get the ladies to stop their campaign or he will stop the planting of elm trees. Trimmitt comes up with a ploy to get the ladies to give up. The next day Trimmitt and Swanson come by to cut down Donna's tree. Donna comes up with a ploy of her own to stop Trimmitt. She is sitting up in the tree and then a TV news truck arrives. Trimmitt agrees to give up his idea of planting elm trees. Paulene Myers as Ethel Featherspoon, Trimmitt's secretary. Maxine Stuart as Helena Whitcomb. Aline Towne as Helen.
258	10	"The Big League Shock"	Andrew McCullough	Lou Shaw	November 18, 1965
Bill Dayton (Mark Slade), the son of a friend of Donna's, comes by the house. he will be going to Jeff's college. Donna mentions the excellent grades he got in high school and that he was valedictorian of the class. It is not long before Bill finds college a rough adjustment. His grades are nowhere near as good as he would like. Bill goes to see Mr. Devlin (William Lanteau), the freshman advisor. Devlin thinks Bill's grades are fine. Bill studies more and more, but his grades are getting worse. Bill starts taking "pep pills" to keep himself awake so he can study late into the night. When Alex finds out about the pills, he tells Bill to stay away from them as it will only make things worse. Bill was about to look in Alex's bag, when Donna walks in the room. Donna sees Bill talking to Mr. Samson (Charles Lane) the pharmacist. Donna learns that Bill forged Alex's signature on a prescription for more pills. Alex gets a call and finds out that Bill turned himself into the police. Donna goes to see Bill in jail. Alex brings Dr. Farrel (Dennis Cross), the staff psychiatrist from college, to talk to Bill. Bill agrees to let the doctor help him. Soon Bill's grades improve.
259	11	"The Gladiators"	Alan Rafkin	Paul West	November 25, 1965
Both the Stones and the Kelseys must deal with visitors at the same time. Alex's father and Midge's mother prove to be disruptive until the plan is hatched to have them spend time with each other. Lee Patrick as Maudie Baker.
260	12	"Rally Around the Girls, Boys"	Lawrence Dobkin	Jack Harvey & Irving Taylor	December 2, 1965
Jeff and Alex laugh about the prospect of women entering the Hilldale car rally. Rally drivers are given specific route directions in code to follow. Jeff and Alex are surprised when Donna actually got one of the coded messages right. Jeff, Scotty, Bebe (Candy Moore) and Susanna (Sandy Descher) are on an outing by the lake. Later that day, Jeff and Scotty have to get back home, but the girls want to stay. The girls suggest that Scotty ride with Jeff and they will take Scotty's car home later. Scotty's worried that the girls will get lost, which is what happens. Jeff goes to get them. At the malt shop, the boys tease the girls about not being able to follow Jeff's map home. The girls decide to enter the rally. Alex makes a bet with Donna that the boys will win. Even though they have no idea what they are doing, and with a little help from Donna, the girls make it to the finish tied with Jeff and Scotty. The girls answer the tie breaking question correctly and win. Alex does not think he should honor the bet when he figures out Donna helped the girls. Dabney Coleman as the Rally Master.
261	13	"Slipped Disc"	Lawrence Dobkin	Jack Harvey & Irving Taylor	December 9, 1965
Jeff's rock band plays at a local party. Lucy Ann (Janis Hansen) asks them if they have ever thought about making a record. She reviews new records for the school paper. Jeff thinks it is a good idea. They set out to get enough money to buy recording equipment. It takes a bit of doing, but they get the money. They set up in Jeff's garage. After they tape a song, they need to raise even more money to have records pressed. They go to see Mr. Cardwell (Henry Hunter) at the bank to borrow $450. But without collateral, Cardwell cannot help them. They decide to sell shares of stock in their "record company" to all the kids at school. While driving home with their records, the boys get a flat tire. In order to change the tire, they have to place the 3000 records on the sidewalk. All the records warp in the sunlight. Thanks to Trisha, the boys figure out a way to make money with the damaged discs. Jess Kirkpatrick as Mr. Richards. C. Lindsay Workman as Charlie Henderson.
262	14	"Uncle Jeff Needs You"	Lawrence Dobkin	Sam Locke & Joel Rapp	December 16, 1965
Jeff needs to be a camp counselor to get a college credit. He is required to recruit two campers to get the position. He is paying Trisha to get names of boys in the neighborhood. Karen calls Jeff to remind him about the picnic they were supposed to go on. He had actually forgot about it and asks if they could postpone it. Jeff is having a hard time finding anybody willing to sign up. Jeff meets two brothers, Greg and Billy Williams, in the park that could be good prospects. Jeff meets who he thinks is their mother, but it turns out she is Miss Carson, their governess. The next day Jeff has to cancel on Karen again because he needs to go see the boys parents. Jeff learns from Miss Carson that the boys parents will not be back in town for another day. Jeff has to cancel on Karen yet again. Jeff finally meets their parents. Mr. Williams (DeForest Kelley) agrees to let the boys go to the camp. The next day the boys tag along with Jeff and Karen on the picnic. Before going home, they meet two other boys, Lennie and Spike, and agree to take them home as well. Turns out Mr. Williams is being sent to Europe and has to take his family with. He will have to cancel out on the camp. In the end, Mr. Williams and Alex agree to split the cost of sending Lennie and Spike to the camp. Jeff learns that Karen will be a counselor at the girls camp next to his, so he will be able to see her all summer.
263	15	"Never Look a Gift House in the Mouth"	Lawrence Dobkin	Gary Abrams & Paul Petersen	December 23, 1965
Donna is having Alex and Jeff rearrange some of the furiture in the living room. Dorothy Evans (Betsy Jones-Moreland) asks if the Stones could take care of her parents lake house while she is away in Europe. Donna and Alex remember spending a lot of time there. Alex, however, is a little reluctant about the offer. Jeff suggests that his fraternity take care of the place. Dorothy thinks it is a great idea. Alex warns Jeff that it could be a lot of work. When the boys show up to the cabin, they find it in total disrepair. Jeff reminds them that they are getting the place rent free. The boys find to fix it up is a lot more work than they anticipated. Meanwhile, Donna and Alex reminisce about the work they put into the place when they were younger. Jeff comes home and his hands are all blistered. Alex gives him some stuff to treat the guys with. Jeff invites Donna and Alex to their first social at the cabin. He overhears them talk about some of the old things they look forward to seeing. Jeff knows that many of those things have been removed. Jeff gets the guys to replace those things. While many things are different, Donna and Alex are pleasantly surprised to see some of their favorite things about the cabin are still there.
264	16	"How to Handle a Woman"	Andrew McCullough	Andrew McCullough	December 30, 1965
Smitty tells Jeff and Scotty that he has fallen for a girl named Deborah (Linda Gaye Scott). Jeff and Scotty are at the malt shop with Bebe and Susan (Catherine Ferrar). Smitty and Deborah show up. Deborah is writing a term paper about how men are the weaker sex. Jeff decides males are the superior sex. Smitty just goes along with whatever Deborah says. Later, Jeff and Scotty tell Smitty that he needs to dominate Deborah and she will love him for it. The next time they are all at the malt shop, Deborah says she will pay the check. When Smitty puts his foot down, there is a bit of a disagreement and the girls leave. Donna finds out about the boys superior attitude. The boys agree that Jeff will take out Deborah and put her in her place. The boys start acting like the boss and tell the girls what to do. At the end of the evening, Deborah puts Jeff in his place. Donna disapproves of what the boys are doing. She helps the young women make the boys see the errors of their ways, Jeff most of all. Alex gets taught a lesson as well. Chanin Hale as Myrtle the Waitress.
265	17	"My Son, the Councilman"	Lawrence Dobkin	Ronny Pearlman	January 6, 1966
Jeff and his friend Gerelda (Sheila James) talk to Zeke (John Qualen), an old man who often sits on a park bench. They learn from him that City Commissioner Trimmitt wants to close down the park. There is an election coming up, but Trimmitt is running unopposed. Gerelda wants Jeff to run for city council and starts campaigning. Jeff says there is an age limit, but Gerelda finds a loophole. Jeff agrees to run and they set out to get 500 signatures to put him on the ballot. Donna even signs the ballot thinking it has to be a different Jeff Stone. After finding out it is her Jeff, Donna talks Alex into signing the ballot and it gives Jeff the needed signatures. Mrs. Featherspoon (Paulene Myers), Trimmitt's secretary, sees the posters being put up for Jeff. Trimmitt wants to find out who Jeff is. Gerelda convinces a reluctant Jeff to debate Trimmitt on TV. After the debate, the polls show Jeff has a chance to win. Jeff agrees to leave the race if Trimmitt will keep the park open and let Zeke have his bench. Later, Jeff learns that Gerelda wants to stay in politics and is campaigning for Trimmitt. Rickie Sorensen as Boy Soliciting Petition Signatures.
266	18	"Do It Yourself Donna"	Lee Philips	Lou Shaw	January 15, 1966
Donna and Midge shop for a stereo for Jeff's birthday. Midge talks Donna into buying a "do it yourself" stereo kit. Alex tells Donna that he knows nothing about electronics. Alex reluctantly agrees to attempt to assemble the stereo in Midge's garage. Donna and Alex are actually having fun putting the stereo together. Jeff and Trisha sense something is going on. It is not long before the building gets more complicated and Alex is injuring his fingers. Trisha wonders where her parents sneak off to every night. Trisha follows them one night to Midge's garage. She and Jeff find out that Donna and Alex are trying to build the stereo for his birthday. Jeff tells Julie (Bonnie Beecher) what his parents are doing and he is sure they are having a tough time. Jeff gets Smitty to help build it when his parents are not around. Separately, Donna and Alex find out Smitty is helping, but neither says anything to each other. On his birthday, Jeff gets the stereo and Trisha gives him a sweater she made. When Jeff puts it on, it tears apart and Trisha feels bad. Jeff says it is better to get a gift that someone worked to make themselves. Sandy Kenyon as the Stereo Clerk.
267	19	"When I Was Your Age"	Andrew McCullough	Jack Raymond	January 22, 1966
Jeff tells Donna and Alex that he and Bebe want to get married. Donna panics as she believes they are too young to marry. Alex does not think she should overreact. They should find subtle ways to let Jeff know how they feel. Alex has a man to man talk with Jeff, but it does not change how Jeff feels. Jeff invited Bebe over for dinner so her and Donna could talk. Bebe arrives and her and Donna have a chat, but Donna makes no progress. Bebe mentions that she has not told her parents yet. Jeff suggests that Donna and Alex tell them. The next morning, Alex wants to go talk to Bebe's father, Ben (John Stephenson). Donna thinks it would be better if she went to talk to Harriet. But, when Donna gets to their house, Ben and Harriet know about the wedding and are more than happy about it. Bebe is there with her wedding dress on. Later, Bebe's parents come to the Stone house and say they are against the wedding. Turns out they were only putting on a show for Bebe's sake. Both parents are now worried that the children may have eloped. The parents are relieved when Jeff and Bebe say they decided they are not ready to get married.
268	20	"Calling Willie Mays"	Lawrence Dobkin	Jack Harvey & Irving Taylor	January 29, 1966
Alex has to take a trip to San Francisco for a conference. Donna and Jeff would like to go with. Because Trisha has school, she could stay with Midge. Alex says no, but later gives in. While there, old friend Willie Mays tells Donna and Jeff that he can get them a pair of tickets to one of his games. Meanwhile, Alex and Dr. Lionel Grayson (Edmon Ryan) are arguing where some funding should go. Donna spends some time with Mrs. Sally Grayson (Amzie Strickland). A problem arises when Alex, Jeff, and Donna each believe that the others have plans and they each invite a guest to join them at the game. Jeff and his date Vicki get to the game first and take the tickets. When Donna and Sally find out there are no tickets, they just go back to the hotel. After bragging to Lionel earlier in the day that he knew Willie, Alex now has to buy tickets from a scalper. Willie hits the game winning home run and Alex catches the ball. Back at the hotel, Lionel is quite upset. Donna tells Alex to give him the ball, which he reluctantly does. They all find out that Jeff got the tickets. Willie comes by the hotel and Alex is able to prove to Grayson that they are friends. Willie signs the ball and is able to get Alex and Lionel to over come their differences. The next day, Willie gives Donna and Sally each balls signed by the whole team. Smoki Whitfield as 1st Ticket Clerk. Baynes Barron as 2nd Ticket Clerk.
269	21	"All This and Voltaire Too?"	Lawrence Dobkin	Erna Lazarus	February 5, 1966
Donna and Midge take French lessons from the owner of a French restaurant. Stanley Adams and Naomi Stevens appear as Mr. & Mrs. Voltaire.
270	22	"The Return of Mark"	Lee Philips	Barbara Avedon	February 12, 1966
Mark Claridge (Warren Stevens), a former boyfriend of Donna's, arrives back in Hilldale, wealthy and accomplished. he is even donating an entire wing to the hospital. Donna invites him over to dinner. Alex is not happy about it. Donna reminds him she dated Mark for two months when they were sixteen. When Jeff hears about Mark, he teases Alex about the amount of money Mark has. That night, Alex is a little surprised at how nice the table is set. Donna comes in wearing a beautiful dress. Mark arrives and Trisha tells Alex how handsome Mark is. After dinner, Mark tells about some of his adventures, but then asks the family to tell him about them. Mark leaves and Alex is upset about how much the kids liked Mark. The next morning Midge asks Donna how it was seeing Mark again. Mark was supposed to leave town for business, but he suddenly shows up at the house. He tells Donna that he has decided to stay in Hilldale. Midge tells Donna that he is staying because of her. After Donna and Alex talk to him, Mark realizes that the simple life really is not for him. Donna learns that the reason they broke up was because she would not give Mark the answer on a history test.
271	23	"Is There a Small Hotel?"	Andrew McCullough	Laurence Marks	February 19, 1966
The family is trying to decide where to go on vacation. Alex wants a place that has a golf course. Alex decides the family will go to California. Midge comes by and suggests Hawaii. Crandall the milkman (Arte Johnson) tells Donna about the wonderful time he and his wife had in New York. At the office, Mrs. Barton the nurse (Nora Marlowe) tells Alex he should go fishing and camping in Colorado. Mr. Carter (Peter Leeds), the Postman, tells Donna they should go to Butte, Montana. there is a large open pit copper mine there. Dr. George Metcalfe (Judson Pratt) suggests to Alex they go to the Montecito Hotel in Jamaica. George says there are four golf courses there. Jim the gardener (James Hong) tells Donna they should go to Mexico City because there are no golf courses there. Donna makes Mexican food for dinner and Alex brings her a bottle of Jamaican perfume. Trisha tells them that a friend of hers suggested Alaska. Jeff comes in wearing a scuba diver outfit and suggests going to Florida. The next day, Crandall, Carter and Jim argue over which place is best for a vacation. At the hospital, Mr. Phillips (William Lanteau), a patient, tells Alex to go to Las Vegas. An Orderly, Phillips and Nurse Barton argue over a vacation place. To stop the arguing, Donna and Alex lie and tell each of the people they are going with their suggestion. That plan backfires on them.
272	24	"No More Parties, Almost"	Andrew McCullough	Clifford Goldsmith	February 26, 1966
Donna and Alex have attended a lot of parties lately. They decide to spend some time at home, enjoying their children and each other. Alex asks Donna to make an excuse for an invitation to the Kingsley's on Friday. Donna calls to state they can not attend as they might be going on a trip. Midge asks Donna if she could ride with them to the Slocum anniversary party that night. Donna tells Midge that they were not invited. Donna calls Alex and asks him if he and Steve Slocum (Kirk Alyn) got along when they played golf the other day. Later, Mrs. McCracken (Alice Backes) calls and Trisha answers the phone. Mrs. McCracken wanted to talk to Donna, but Trisha says she is not home. Trisha gets excited when Mrs. McCracken mentions that she heard they were going on a trip. Word quickly spreads about Donna's trip. Donna tells Alex about the Slocum's party. At the party, Nellie Slocum (Aline Towne) asks Midge why the Stones are not there. Nellie finds out that her husband Steve forgot to mail the invite. Meanwhile, Donna confesses to Alex that she made up the story about doing on a trip. Nellie calls Donna, tells her about Steve forgetting to mail the invite and insists they come over. At the party they wind up getting invites to many more parties.
273	25	"So You Really Think You're Young at Heart"	Andrew McCullough	Rick Mittleman	March 5, 1966
Midge tells Donna that her and Dave had an argument about getting old. Alex finds a quiz in the newspaper about being young at heart and thinks Donna filled it out. Her quiz answers put Donna in the category of "old fuddy duddy". Alex tries to get Donna to do some spontaneous fun things, but it does not really work. Donna tells Midge how strangely Alex was acting. Midge says that maybe he thinks he is getting old and is overcompensating. Donna then finds the quiz and believes Alex filled it out. Now Donna wants to have Alex do those fun spontaneous things. Despite both being tired, they go out for a very late night of doing various things. Donna and Alex finally get home and both are exhausted. Midge comes over and tells them that she and Dave made up. They are going on a moon-lite rowboat on the late. Midge asks Donna and Alex if they want to join them. Donna and Alex find out that it was Dave that filled out the quiz and that was what started the fight between Midge and Dave. Later, Midge calls Donna and tells her that Dave hurt his back rowing the boat. Paul Bryar as Huckster.
274	26	"What Price Home?"	Andrew McCullough	Paul West & Andrew McCullough	March 12, 1966
Amanda Featherstone Bullock (Sarah Marshall) drops by and tells Donna she used to live in the Stone house when she was young. She asks if it is OK to bring her husband Bull Bullock (Frank Maxwell) by later to see if he likes the house. Donna is surprised when Amanda says that if he does, they want to buy it. That night, Donna tells Alex what happened. When the Bullocks come over, Bull does not seem impressed with the house and points out many flaws. But something Amanda does, changes Bull's mind. Alex sets an unreasonably high price for the house thinking they will not want to buy. The husband accepts the price and Bull and Alex shake hands. Alex calls a lawyer and apparently the deal is legal. Alex tells the kids and they are actually excited. Alex and Donna go to see Felix (Dan Tobin), a real estate agent, about buying another house. They look at a really run down house. Donna hates it, but Alex and Jeff see a lot of possibilities. They look at several other homes. They finally find a house, but will miss the old one and its memories. When the Bullocks come by with the check, Alex says he cannot sell. Amanda says she only lived in the house a short time and she really does not have to live here again. The two families mutually call off the deal.
275	27	"By-Line: Jeffrey Stone"	Andrew McCullough	Story by: Jack Raymond; Teleplay by: Andrew McCullough	March 19, 1966
Jeff and Smitty have written a song that could be a big break for them if only someone big in the music business would sing it. They hope to get Lesley Gore to record it. Donna's friend Maddy (Binnie Barnes), a newspaper reporter, is to do an interview with Lesley. Jeff talks her into letting him do the interview. Maddy likes what Jeff comes up with and gives him a byline on the front page. But it turns out that Jeff completely distorted what Lesley said. Lesley demands a retraction in the paper. Jeff writes one and Lesley likes what she reads. She calls Donna and has her bring Jeff's song to her. Lesley also gets Donna to bring Jeff to her next concert where she performs his song.
