= American Cinema Editors Awards 1968 =

18th ACE Eddie Awards
- Presented by: American Cinema Editors
- Date: March 16, 1968
- Site: Beverly Hills Hotel, Beverly Hills, California
- Hosted by: Regis Philbin

Highlights
- Best Film: The Dirty Dozen

The 18th American Cinema Editors Awards, which were presented on Saturday, March 16, 1968, at the Crystal Ballroom in the Beverly Hills Hotel, honored the best editors in films and television. The award was hosted by comedian Regis Philbin. "Mini-Eddies" were given out to all of the nominees for the first time in its award history. Director and producer Stanley Kramer won the "ACE Golden Eddie Filmmaker of the Year Award" for "outstanding achievements in filmmaking, climaxing a career which began in film editing."

== Nominees ==
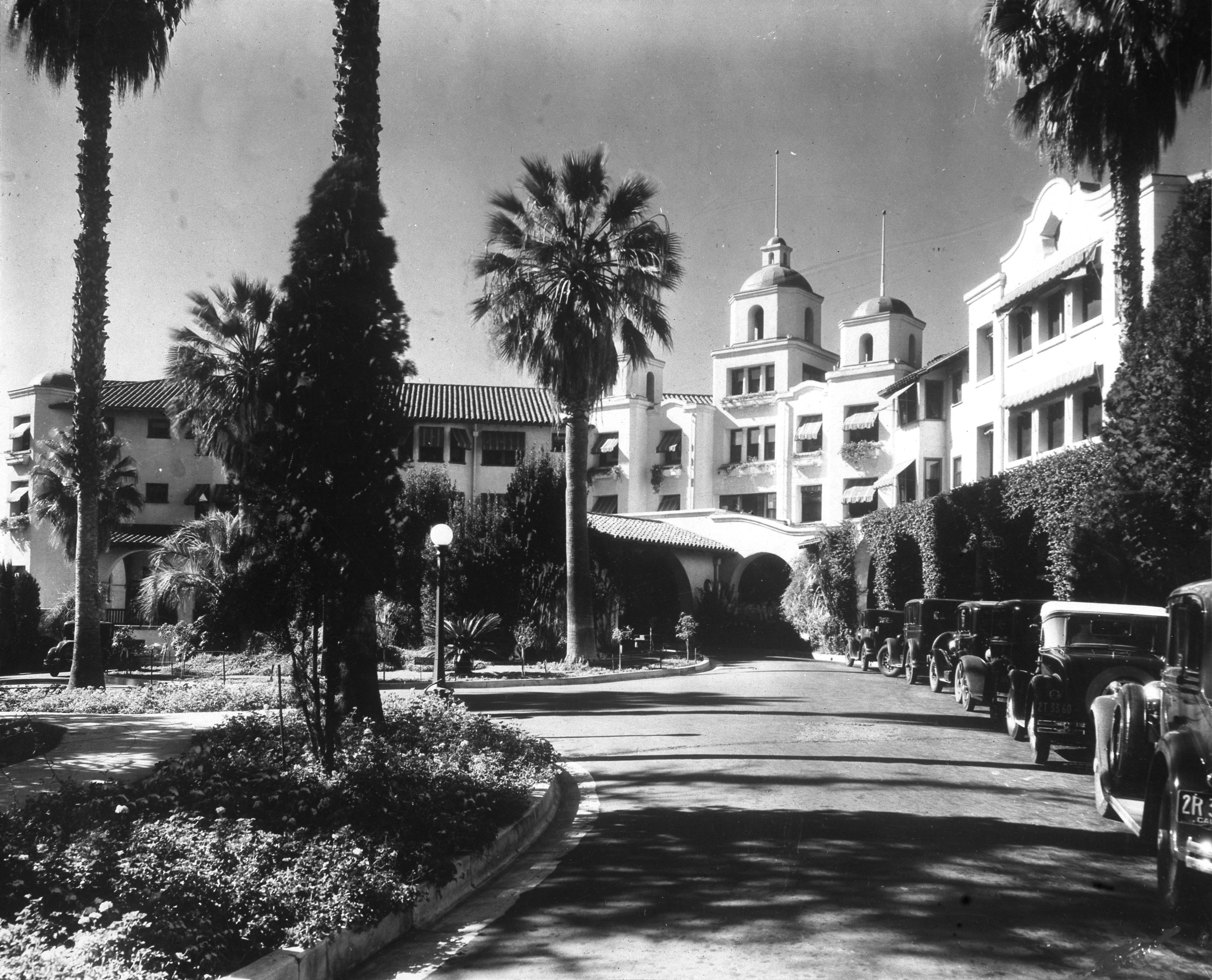
The Beverly Hills Hotel in 1925, the site of the award ceremony.

Best Edited Feature Film	Best Edited Television Program	
The Dirty Dozen – Michael Luciano; 'Beach Red – Frank P. Keller; Bonnie and Clyde – Dede Allen; Doctor Dolittle – Samuel E. Beetley and Marjorie Fowler; In the Heat of the Night – Hal Ashby; Guess Who's Coming to Dinner	Robert C. Jones	The Big Valley: "Disappearance" – Desmond Marquette; Bewitched: "A Most Unusual Wood Nymph" – Aaron Nibley; Daniel Boone: "Tanner" – Harry Coswick; The Fugitive: "The Judgment: Part 2" – Jodie Copelan; Gunsmoke: "A Hat" – Gerard Wilson; The High Chaparral: "The Widow From Red Rock" – Harry W. Gerstad; Ironside: "A Very, Cool, Hot Car" – Edward W. Williams
