= Storm Fear =

1956 film by Cornel Wilde

- Theatrical release poster
- Directed by: Cornel Wilde
- Screenplay by: Horton Foote
- Based on: Storm Fear by Clinton Seeley
- Produced by: Cornel Wilde
- Starring: Cornel Wilde; Jean Wallace; Dan Duryea
- Cinematography: Joseph LaShelle
- Edited by: Otto Ludwig
- Music by: Elmer Bernstein
- Production company: Theodora Productions
- Distributed by: United Artists
- Release dates: December 16, 1955 (New York City); February 1, 1956 (United States)
- Running time: 88 minutes
- Country: United States
- Language: English

Storm Fear is a 1955 American crime drama film noir directed by Cornel Wilde in his directorial debut, and starring Wilde, Jean Wallace, Dan Duryea, and Lee Grant. It follows a bank robber and his gang who seek shelter at his brother's mountain cabin, where he rekindles a romance with his brother's wife and connects with her son, whom he believes he fathered. It is based on the 1954 novel of the same name by Clinton Seeley.

== Plot ==
After being wounded during a heist in the days after Christmas, bank robber Charlie Blake takes refuge in a remote farm house owned by his older brother Fred, who lives there with wife Elizabeth and 12-year-old son David. A weak and unhappy man nearly debilitated by respiratory issues, Fred is bullied and beaten into harboring the fugitive and his gang members, the brutal Benjie and moll Edna.

Time passes and Charlie's accomplices are anxious to move on, but he needs rest to recover. He is also still in love with Fred's wife Elizabeth (Wallace), with whom he once had an affair. Elizabeth's hired hand Hank is in love with her, too. Fred must endure both situations, plus the taunting and physical abuse of Benjie.

More trouble ensues when suspicions arise that Elizabeth's son was actually fathered by Charlie. A heavy snow and his bullet wound delay Charlie's escape, but when Fred sneaks away to alert the police, David, who has a fondness for Charlie, guides the gang members through the snowy terrain. Elizabeth is tied up and left behind.

Edna breaks an ankle in a fall and Charlie cruelly abandons her in the wilderness. Hank comes across Fred's frozen corpse. An argument breaks out between Charlie and Benjie along the way, resulting in David picking up a gun and shooting Benjie, killing him. Charlie now has the robbery loot to himself, but Hank turns up and shoots him. Charlie dies without acknowledging whether or not he is the boy's real father.

== Cast ==
- Cornel Wilde as Charlie Blake
- Jean Wallace as Elizabeth Blake
- Dan Duryea as Fred Blake
- Lee Grant as Edna Rogers
- David Stollery as David Blake
- Dennis Weaver as Hank
- Steven Hill as Benjie

== Production ==
The film was based on a novel by Clinton Seeley which was published in November 1954. The New York Times called the Sealey work "a pleasant discovery... a tale of terror presented with economy, insight and a surprising amount of technical skill." It was told through the first person of a 12 year old, Davie.

Cornel Wilde bought the film rights in December 1954.

Wilde had recently moved into producing, establishing his own company, Theodora, with his then-wife Jean Wallace. Their first film was The Big Combo. In January 1955 he hired Horton Foote to write the script, and announced he wanted this to be Theodora's second film, putting others (Curly, Lord Byron, Second Act Curtain) on the back burner.

Wilde, who had recently directed an episode of General Electric Theatre, decided to direct this.

Steven Hill, a highly regarded Broadway player, was cast as a gang member in the film.

Filming was intended to start April 15, 1955 in Sun Valley, Idaho, but Wilde found the date had to be brought forward to April 5 to get the snow-topped mountains he wanted. "I wasn't able to do the pre-camera rehearsals I had planned but everything worked out," said Wilde. "The weather was a big problem and we had to adjust our schedules to it, jumping from scenes requiring bright sunlight to moody stuff as the sun played hide and seek with the clouds."

== Release ==
Storm Fear premiered in New York City on December 16, 1955.

=== Home media ===
Kino Lorber released Storm Fear on Blu-ray in 2015, and reissued it as part of a multi-film noir collection in 2022.

== See also ==
- List of American films of 1955

== Sources ==
- Crowther, Bruce (1988). Film Noir: Reflections in a Dark Mirror. London, England: Columbus Books. ISBN 978-0-862-87402-5.
