= Paramount Ranch Racetrack =

Racetrack in Agoura Hills, California

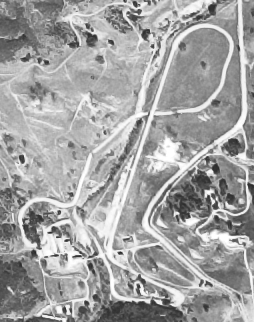
- Aerial photo of Paramount Ranch Racetrack in 1963, five years after its closure
- Location: Agoura Hills, California, United States
- Coordinates: 34.121°N 118.7544°W
- Owner: National Park Service
- Opened: 1956
- Closed: 1957

Road course
- Surface: Asphalt
- Length: 2 mi (3.2 km)
- Turns: 11

Paramount Ranch Racetrack (sometimes called Paramount Ranch Raceway) was a motorsports racetrack located at Paramount Movie Ranch in the Santa Monica Mountains in Agoura Hills, California. A total of seven events were held at Paramount Ranch from 1956–1957. After a series of fatalities in short proximity to each other, the track gained a reputation for being a dangerous circuit. After two seasons, Paramount Ranch Racetrack was closed.

== Background ==
In 1956, the owner of Paramount Ranch decided to build a road-racing facility. He approached Ken Miles and Dick Van Laanen to design the road course. They designed a paved figure 8 road course nearly 2 miles (3.2 km) in length. The road course included 11 turns with uphill and downhill sections, a straightaway just shy of 3/4 mile, a bridge and underpass as well as a lake opposite the start/finish line. Bob Bondurant described the course as "unforgiving but a real challenge."

== Events ==
A total of seven events were held at Paramount Ranch. Five events were sponsored by the California Sports Car Club (CSCC) and two by the United States Auto Club (USAC).

=== August 18–19, 1956 (CSCC) ===
Date	Race Number	Laps/Time Limit	Class	Winner	Car
Saturday, August 18, 1956	1	8	Production sedans up to 1500cc	Fred Woodward	Alfa Romeo
Saturday, August 18, 1956	2	8	Production under 1500cc	Ed Barker	Porsche Speedster
Saturday, August 18, 1956	3	8	Production over 1500cc	Rudy Cleye	Mercedes Benz 300SL
Saturday, August 18, 1956	4	8	Formula III and Formula Libre	Bruce Kessler	Cooper-Norton
Saturday, August 18, 1956	5	8	Modified under 1500cc	Richie Ginther	Porsche Spyder
Saturday, August 18, 1956	6	8	Modified 1500cc to 3000cc		
Saturday, August 18, 1956	7	8	Modified over 3000cc		
Sunday, August 19, 1956	8	12	Consolation under 1500cc	Robert Chamberlin	MGTC
Sunday, August 19, 1956	9	12	Consolation over 1500cc	Bruce Kessler	Cooper Mark IX
Sunday, August 19, 1956	10	1 hour	Under 1500cc main event	Richie Ginther	Porsche Spyder
Sunday, August 19, 1956	11	8	Ladies race	Ruth Levy	Porsche Super Speedster
Sunday, August 19, 1956	12	1 hour	Over 1500cc main event	Harrison Evans	Ferrari Monza

=== November 4, 1956 (USAC) ===
250 miles (402 km) USAC National Championship Stock Car Road Race. 32 cars entered the race with Sam Hanks winning the race in 3 hours and 36 minutes while driving his red and white 1956 Mercury finishing ahead of Johnny Mantz.

=== November 17–18, 1956 (CSCC) ===
Date	Race Number	Laps/Time Limit	Class	Winner	Car
Saturday, November 17, 1956	1	30 min	Production sedans up to 1500cc	Jack Dair	
Saturday, November 17, 1956	2	30 min	Formula III	Jean Geslin	Cooper-Norton
Sunday, November 18, 1956	3	45 min	Production under 1500cc	Dale Johnson	Porsche Carrera
Sunday, November 18, 1956	4	45 min	Production over 1500cc	Bob Oker	AC Ace-Bristol
Sunday, November 18, 1956	5	45 min	Modified under 1500cc	(United Kingdom) Ken Miles	Porsche Cooper
Sunday, November 18, 1956	6	90 min	Modified over 1500cc	(United Kingdom) Ken Miles	Porsche Cooper

=== March 9–10, 1957 (CSCC) ===
Date	Race Number	Laps/Time Limit	Class	Winner	Car
Saturday, March 9, 1957	1	n/a	Production sedans under 1500cc - Canceled	n/a	n/a
Saturday, March 9, 1957	2	10	Production under 1300cc	Fred Woodward	
Saturday, March 9, 1957	3	6	Production 1300cc - 1500cc	Ed Barker	
Saturday, March 9, 1957	4	6	Production 1500cc - 2000cc	Bob Oker	
Saturday, March 9, 1957	5	6	Production over 2000cc	Jack Bates	
Saturday, March 9, 1957	6	6	Formula III	Ralph Ormsbee	
Saturday, March 9, 1957	7	6	Modified under 1100cc	Frank Monise	
Saturday, March 9, 1957	7a	6	Modified 1100cc - 1500cc	(United States) Bob Drake	
Saturday, March 9, 1957	8	10	Modified over 1500cc	Eric Hauser	
Sunday, March 10, 1957	9	10	Production under 1500cc	E. Forbes-Robinson	
Sunday, March 10, 1957	10	10	Production over 1500cc	John Haggerty	
Sunday, March 10, 1957	11	10	Modified	Frank Livingstone	
Sunday, March 10, 1957	12	1 hour	Under 1500cc modified	Bob Drake	
Sunday, March 10, 1957	13	8	Women's race and production sedans up to 1500cc	Ruth Levy	
Sunday, March 10, 1957	14	1 hour	Over 1500cc modified	Jerry Austin	Jaguar D-Type

=== April 28, 1957 (USAC) ===
100 miles (161 km) USAC National Championship Stock Car race was won by Troy Ruttman driving a 1957 Ford. Ruttman finished 41 seconds ahead of Sam Hanks, followed closely behind by Jimmy Reece.

=== June 15–16, 1957 (CSCC) ===
Date	Race Number	Laps/Time Limit	Class	Winner	Car
Saturday, June 15, 1957	1	8	Production sedans up to 1300cc	Willie West	
Saturday, June 15, 1957	2	10	Production 1300cc - 1500cc	E Forbes-Robinson	
Saturday, June 15, 1957	3	10	Production 1500cc - 2700cc	Jim Parkinson	
Saturday, June 15, 1957	4	10	Production over 2700cc	Jack Bates	
Saturday, June 15, 1957	5	10	Formula III	Jean Geslin	
Saturday, June 15, 1957	6	10	Modified under 1000cc	Rico Verrecchia	
Saturday, June 15, 1957	7	10	Modified 1000cc - 1500cc	(United Kingdom) Ken Miles	
Saturday, June 15, 1957	8	10	Modified over 1500cc	(United States) Chuck Daigh	Troutman-Barnes Ford Thunderbird
Sunday, June 16, 1957	9	30 min	Production under 1500cc	E Forbes-Robinson	
Sunday, June 16, 1957	10	30 min	Production over 1500cc	Jim Parkinson	
Sunday, June 16, 1957	11	10	Modified & Formula III	Pete Woods	
Sunday, June 16, 1957	12	1 hour	Under 1500cc main event	(United Kingdom) *Ken Miles	Porsche 550 Spyder
Sunday, June 16, 1957	13	8	Women's Race	Ruth Levy	
Sunday, June 16, 1957	14	1 hour	Over 1500cc Main Event	(United States) Chuck Daigh	Troutman-Barnes Ford Thunderbird

Multiple MGTDs crashed during the first race resulting in five people being injured including one driver that was hospitalized.

This was Chuck Daigh's first overall win in a main event and also the first time a Ford V8 powered car won a major sports car race in the US. In the under 1500cc main event, Ken Miles was subsequently disqualified several days later due to a rule infraction when judges ruled that Miles made a brief pit-stop in a restricted area to accept a drink of water during the one-hour race. Runner up Jack McAfee who was also driving a Porsche 550 Spyder was declared the winner.

=== December 7–8, 1957 (CSCC) ===
Date	Race Number	Laps/Time Limit	Class	Winner	Car
Saturday, December 7, 1957	1	10	Production under 1300cc	Willie West	
Saturday, December 7, 1957	2	10	Production under 1500cc	Jimmy Moore	
Saturday, December 7, 1957	3	10	Production 1500cc-2700cc	William Love	
Saturday, December 7, 1957	4	10	Production over 2700cc	Jerry Austin	
Saturday, December 7, 1957	5	10	Formula III Formula Libre, and Formula II	Bob Drake	
Saturday, December 7, 1957	6	10	Modified under 1000cc	Jim Parkinson	
Saturday, December 7, 1957	7	30 min	Modified 1000cc - 1500cc	Jean P Kunstle	
Saturday, December 7, 1957	8	30 min	Production over 1500cc	(United States) Dan Gurney	Ferrari 375 Plus
Sunday, December 8, 1957	9	8	Production MG's only	Ray Pickering	
Sunday, December 8, 1957	10	8	Production over 2000cc	Jerry Austin	
Sunday, December 8, 1957	11	8	Modified under 1100cc, Prod under 2000cc and Formula III	Ronnie Bucknum	
Sunday, December 8, 1957	12	1 hour	Under 1500cc main event	(United Kingdom) Ken Miles	
Sunday, December 8, 1957	13	8	Ladies race	Linda Scott	
Sunday, December 8, 1957	14	1 hour	Over 1500cc main event	(United States) Dan Gurney	Ferrari 375 Plus

Two fatalities and two others were injured on what would be the final event at Paramount Ranch Racetrack.

During the third race, Hugh Woods driving his Chevrolet Corvette crashed into a guard rail entering turn 1. The steel railing sliced through the car and Woods' right leg was severed. He also incurred injuries to his left leg, and fractures in both arms.

In the next race, a very similar accident occurred involving George Sherrerd driving his Jaguar XK120. Sherrerd hit the steel barrier which was still projecting after being hit by Woods in the previous race. The barrier sheared through the car and through Sherrerd, killing him instantly.

Turn 1 was generally not considered a dangerous turn on the track. The consensus was that both drivers just went into the turn "too hot." It was subsequently revealed that the guardrail was installed incorrectly and was facing backwards.

In the fifth race, Rolf Roth hit a hay bale leaving turn 11 and flipped his Formula III. Roth suffered a broken left wrist. Roth's roll bar was credited with saving him.

Nearing the final lap of the final race of the event, Jim Firestone driving a Frazer Nash Bristol lost control near turn 2 and hit a stack of tires, causing his car to flip. Firestone was ejected and was hit by the car, which crushed his skull and neck. He was declared dead on arrival upon arriving at Northridge Community Hospital.

== Today ==
The National Park Service maintains the entire ranch including the racetrack as a historic site. Today, very little remains of the racetrack. As of 2015 the bridge still remains, however it has been blocked off so vehicles cannot drive over it. The road underneath the bridge has been overgrown with trees and shrubs. Home construction in the neighboring hillsides has caused water runoff which has destroyed the original layout and terrain of the land from when the track was constructed. Much of the roads are no longer discernable. While there is some sentiment among park rangers to repair the circuit and return the track to its former glory, there are no definitive plans in place.

In November 2018, Paramount Ranch suffered near-total destruction during the Woolsey Fire.

== Film and television ==
Paramount Ranch Racetrack has been featured in several movies filmed in the 1950s and 1960s; most notably Devil's Hairpin, Spinout, and Munster, Go Home!.

It was also featured in television shows over the next decade, including the 1965 Perry Mason episode "The Case of the Runaway Racer".

== Bibliography ==
- Evans, Art (2006). Paramount Ranch Remembered. Photo Data Research LLC. ISBN 0-9705073-7-2.
