= Ben Flynn =

Ben Flynn may refer to:

- Ben Eine (real name Ben Flynn born 1970), prolific street artist
- Ben Flynn (True Blood), fictional character
- Ben Flynn, character in Sharks' Treasure
