= The Perfect Snob =

1941 film by Ray McCarey

- Theatrical release poster
- Directed by: Ray McCarey
- Screenplay by: Lee Loeb; Harold Buchman
- Produced by: Walter Morosco
- Starring: Charlie Ruggles; Charlotte Greenwood; Lynn Bari; Cornel Wilde; Anthony Quinn; Alan Mowbray
- Cinematography: Charles G. Clarke
- Edited by: J. Watson Webb, Jr.
- Music by: Cyril J. Mockridge
- Production company: 20th Century Fox
- Distributed by: 20th Century Fox
- Release date: December 19, 1941
- Running time: 63 minutes
- Country: United States
- Language: English

The Perfect Snob is a 1941 American comedy film directed by Ray McCarey and written by Lee Loeb and Harold Buchman. The film stars Charlie Ruggles, Charlotte Greenwood, Lynn Bari, Cornel Wilde, Anthony Quinn and Alan Mowbray. The film was released on December 19, 1941, by 20th Century Fox.

== Plot ==
Small town veterinarian Edgar Mason (Charles Ruggles) discovers from a news-reporter that his just-graduated daughter, Chris (Lynn Bari), is set to marry much older and wealthy Freddie Browning (Alan Mowbray) under the guidance of his gold-digging wife, Martha (Charlotte Greenwood). Mason, disapproving of Browning, comes across young Mike Lord (Cornel Wilde) and bribes him to romance Chris in order to get her away from Browning. Although initially hesitant, Lord begins to genuinely pursue Chris and although she rebuffs him, his persistence manages to successfully break the engagement between Browning and Chris. Lord shows up the next day and reveals the scheme between him and Dr. Mason. Chris, who had begun to fall for Lord, is hurt by the revelation and assumes Lord's affections were all an act. In reality, Lord has genuinely fallen for Chris and, unbeknownst to the Mason family, is wealthy. Although he wants to marry Chris and is certain she feels the same, Lord is concerned that if he reveals his wealth now, he will never know if Chris loves him or his money. In order to get "proof" that Chris isn't just after money, he asks his friend Alex Moreno (Anthony Quinn) to pose as a wealthy sugar plantation owner and romance Chris.

At Martha's insistence, the Mason family visit the sugar plantation, which in reality Lord owns. The latter shows up posing as the plantation foreman, much to the Chris' chagrin. Lord continues to pursue Chris as the supposedly "poor but proud lad with nothing to offer but his heart," in the hopes that she will rebuff the advances of the ostensibly wealthy Moreno. However, as he gets to know her, Moreno begins to genuinely fall for Chris himself. After brief tension, the two men come to an agreement to let the "best man win" while maintaining the pretense that Moreno owns the plantation. This is until Moreno announces his intentions to propose to Chris, wherein Lord fakes a telegram that Moreno is bankrupt. Later that night, Lord encourages Chris to marry the bankrupt Moreno, which Chris angrily says she will do. Now that Chris has shown herself to not be a gold-digger but believing she is in love with Moreno, Lord arranges for another call to say the previous telegram was a mistake and Moreno isn't bankrupt. However, even knowing Moreno is still wealthy, Chris realizes she doesn't care about money and chases after Lord, who is leaving.

Chris and Lord marry. As her parents and Moreno see them off on Lord's boat, Moreno reveals to Martha and Dr. Mason that Lord is wealthy, causing Martha to faint. On board, Lord continues the pretense, claiming the boat to be Moreno's, but stops himself before revealing everything as Chris declares her contentment at being a poor couple, stating jokingly that she'd divorce him if he were to suddenly come into money. Cheerful music plays as a concerned Lord and an oblivious but happy Chris sail away.

== Cast ==
- Charlie Ruggles as Dr. Edgar Mason
- Charlotte Greenwood as Martha Mason
- Lynn Bari as Chris Mason
- Cornel Wilde as Mike Lord
- Anthony Quinn as Alexander Moreno
- Alan Mowbray as Freddie Browning
- Chester Clute as Nibsie Nicholson
- LeRoy Mason as Witch Doctor
- Jack Chefe as Waiter
- Biddle Dorsey as Boat Driver
