= 1960 United States Grand Prix =

- Race 10 of 10 in the 1960 Formula One season

Race details
- Date: November 20, 1960
- Official name: III Grand Prix of the U.S.
- Location: Riverside International Raceway; Riverside, California
- Course: Permanent road course
- Course length: 5.271 km (3.275 miles)
- Distance: 75 laps, 395.325 km (245.643 miles)
- Weather: Temperatures up to 24.4 °C (75.9 °F); Wind speeds up to 18.33 km/h (11.39 mph)

Pole position
| Driver | (United Kingdom) Stirling Moss | Lotus-Climax |
- Time: 1:54.4

Fastest lap
| Driver | (Australia) Jack Brabham | Cooper-Climax |
- Time: 1:56.3 on lap 71

Podium
| First | (United Kingdom) Stirling Moss | Lotus-Climax |
| Second | (United Kingdom) Innes Ireland | Lotus-Climax |
| Third | (New Zealand) Bruce McLaren | Cooper-Climax |

The 1960 United States Grand Prix was a Formula One motor race held on November 20, 1960, at Riverside International Raceway in Riverside, California. It was race 10 of 10 in the 1960 World Championship of Drivers and race 9 of 9 in the 1960 International Cup for Formula One Manufacturers.

Reigning champion Jack Brabham who went into the final round with a 7-point-gap over championship rival Bruce McLaren, was able to successfully defend his title by finishing fourth, becoming the third overall back-to-back Formula One World Champion after Alberto Ascari and Juan Manuel Fangio.

== Summary ==
For whatever reason (unfamiliarity of the fans with open-wheeled cars and European drivers; media disapproval of Eastern promoters; lack of an ongoing championship battle), promoter Alec Ulmann had no more success drumming up support for the 1960 United States Grand Prix at Riverside International Raceway in California than he had the year before in Sebring, Florida.

Set in the desert near the Box Spring Mountain complex east of Los Angeles, the Riverside track featured a particularly demanding uphill esses section, just past the start-finish line. Riverside resident and local hero Dan Gurney headed the field as the natural favorite of the crowd, which numbered only about 25,000. Jack Brabham, who had already clinched his second consecutive World Championship a few weeks prior in Portugal, was back with teammate Bruce McLaren in the factory Cooper-Climaxes. Team Lotus had cars for Jim Clark, Innes Ireland and John Surtees, while Rob Walker entered a Scottish blue Lotus for Stirling Moss. BRM had three mid-engined P48s for Jo Bonnier, Graham Hill and Gurney.

With the Championship chase over, Enzo Ferrari decided to keep his cars at home, believing his time and money would be better spent preparing for the new 1.5-liter Formula for 1961. The team's drivers, Phil Hill and Wolfgang von Trips, however, were allowed to enter the race with other teams. Hill particularly wanted to protect his third-place position in the Championship behind Cooper teammates Brabham and McLaren.

Moss won the pole battle, well ahead of Brabham and Gurney, who completed the front row. Phil Hill was astonished at the "incredible" difference in handling between the year-old, rear-engined green and red Cooper he was given for the race and the Monza winning Dino Ferrari he had been driving all season, but he managed to put it only thirteenth on the grid.

On his way to the track in nearly perfect weather on Sunday morning, race promoter Ulmann realized that, indeed, he had bitten the hand that might have fed him. Following the rousing success of the Los Angeles Times-sponsored Sports Car Grand Prix that summer, where a crowd of 70,000 packed RIR, Ulmann said plainly that a genuine Formula One Grand Prix would surely do even better, since the Times race wasn't really a Grand Prix at all!

Ulmann's words angered Times publisher Otis Chandler, and only Ulmann was surprised when the biggest daily paper in Los Angeles and most of the local media completely ignored the event.

The small crowd of Riverside veterans who were on hand for the race, however, were stunned by the spectacle of the F1 cars. As Brabham took the early lead into Turn One, ahead of Gurney and Moss, the Riverside radio and PA announcer could only call their names and utter, "Wow." The Coopers of Phil Hill and Olivier Gendebien stalled on the grid, but were restarted and got under way. On lap 4, Surtees spun his Lotus in front of teammate Jim Clark, putting himself out, and causing the nosecone from his car to be used to replace the now-shattered one on Clark's.

Still leading, Brabham paid the price for over-reacting to last year's sputtering last lap at Sebring. Not wanting to run out of fuel again, he had overfilled his tanks, and excess fuel was spilling and being ignited by the heat of his exhaust. Two stops failed to find the source of the problem, or to assuage Brabham's concern over the noises and flames erupting from the back of the car.

The Australian's troubles left Moss well in front, and when Gurney's BRM blew a core plug, Moss' teammate Bonnier took second, ahead of Ireland, Graham Hill and Texan Jim Hall, driving his first Grand Prix. Just before halfway through the 75-lap race, Graham Hill retired with a broken gearbox, and Bonnier began to drop back when a broken valve spring caused a misfire. Brabham had been charging up through the field since his pit stops, however, and eventually finished a battling fourth, behind teammate McLaren. Phil Hill ran fifth in the unfamiliar Cooper until a spin dropped him behind Bonnier, who got his ailing BRM home for two points.

Moss won the last race of the two-and-a-half liter era going away, and grabbed third in the Championship for the second year in a row. It was his fourteenth victory under the outgoing regulations, one less than five-time World Champion Juan Manuel Fangio.

After twice failing to realize his dream of hosting Formula One in the U.S., Ulmann generously used his own funds to cover prize and appearance fees. Winner Stirling Moss received a check for $7,500—a staggering sum at the time—and although suppliers had to wait a few months, they were paid in full. The following year, the United States Grand Prix finally found a regular home with a loyal and appreciative crowd in Watkins Glen, New York. Formula One would eventually return to California as well, with the United States Grand Prix West coming to Long Beach in 1976, just 60 miles away.

== Classification ==
=== Qualifying ===
| Pos | No | Driver | Constructor | Time | Gap |
|---|---|---|---|---|---|
| 1 | 5 | (United Kingdom) Stirling Moss | Lotus-Climax | 1:54.4 | — |
| 2 | 2 | (Australia) Jack Brabham | Cooper-Climax | 1:55.0 | +0.6 |
| 3 | 16 | (United States) Dan Gurney | BRM | 1:55.2 | +0.8 |
| 4 | 15 | (Sweden) Jo Bonnier | BRM | 1:55.6 | +1.2 |
| 5 | 12 | (United Kingdom) Jim Clark | Lotus-Climax | 1:55.6 | +1.2 |
| 6 | 11 | (United Kingdom) John Surtees | Lotus-Climax | 1:56.6 | +2.2 |
| 7 | 10 | (United Kingdom) Innes Ireland | Lotus-Climax | 1:57.0 | +2.6 |
| 8 | 7 | (Belgium) Olivier Gendebien | Cooper-Climax | 1:57.2 | +2.8 |
| 9 | 6 | (United Kingdom) Tony Brooks | Cooper-Climax | 1:57.2 | +2.8 |
| 10 | 3 | (New Zealand) Bruce McLaren | Cooper-Climax | 1:57.4 | +3.0 |
| 11 | 17 | (United Kingdom) Graham Hill | BRM | 1:57.6 | +3.2 |
| 12 | 24 | (United States) Jim Hall | Lotus-Climax | 1:58.2 | +3.8 |
| 13 | 9 | (United States) Phil Hill | Cooper-Climax | 1:58.8 | +4.4 |
| 14 | 8 | (United Kingdom) Henry Taylor | Cooper-Climax | 1:59.0 | +4.6 |
| 15 | 14 | (United Kingdom) Roy Salvadori | Cooper-Climax | 1:59.6 | +5.2 |
| 16 | 26 | (Germany) Wolfgang von Trips | Cooper-Maserati | 2:01.4 | +7.0 |
| 17 | 21 | (United Kingdom) Brian Naylor | JBW-Maserati | 2:02.2 | +7.8 |
| 18 | 23 | (United States) Chuck Daigh | Scarab | 2:02.6 | +8.2 |
| 19 | 18 | (France) Maurice Trintignant | Cooper-Maserati | 2:03.2 | +8.8 |
| 20 | 25 | (United States) Pete Lovely | Cooper-Ferrari | 2:03.4 | +9.0 |
| 21 | 4 | (United Kingdom) Ron Flockhart | Cooper-Climax | 2:04.4 | +10.0 |
| 22 | 20 | (United States) Robert Drake | Maserati | 2:05.4 | +11.0 |
| 23 | 19 | (United Kingdom) Ian Burgess | Cooper-Maserati | 2:06.6 | +12.2 |

=== Race ===
| Pos | No | Driver | Constructor | Laps | Time/Retired | Grid | Points |
|---|---|---|---|---|---|---|---|
| 1 | 5 | (United Kingdom) Stirling Moss | Lotus-Climax | 75 | 2:28:52.2 | 1 | 8 |
| 2 | 10 | (United Kingdom) Innes Ireland | Lotus-Climax | 75 | + 38.0 | 7 | 6 |
| 3 | 3 | (New Zealand) Bruce McLaren | Cooper-Climax | 75 | + 52.0 | 10 | 4 |
| 4 | 2 | (Australia) Jack Brabham | Cooper-Climax | 74 | + 1 Lap | 2 | 3 |
| 5 | 15 | (Sweden) Jo Bonnier | BRM | 74 | + 1 Lap | 4 | 2 |
| 6 | 9 | (United States) Phil Hill | Cooper-Climax | 74 | + 1 Lap | 13 | 1 |
| 7 | 24 | (United States) Jim Hall | Lotus-Climax | 73 | + 1 Lap | 12 | |
| 8 | 14 | (United Kingdom) Roy Salvadori | Cooper-Climax | 73 | + 2 Laps | 15 | |
| 9 | 26 | (Germany) Wolfgang von Trips | Cooper-Maserati | 72 | + 3 Laps | 16 | |
| 10 | 23 | (United States) Chuck Daigh | Scarab | 70 | + 5 Laps | 18 | |
| 11 | 25 | (United States) Pete Lovely | Cooper-Ferrari | 69 | + 6 Laps | 20 | |
| 12 | 7 | (Belgium) Olivier Gendebien | Cooper-Climax | 69 | + 6 Laps | 8 | |
| 13 | 20 | (United States) Robert Drake | Maserati | 68 | + 7 Laps | 22 | |
| 14 | 8 | (United Kingdom) Henry Taylor | Cooper-Climax | 68 | + 7 Laps | 14 | |
| 15 | 18 | (France) Maurice Trintignant | Cooper-Maserati | 66 | + 9 Laps | 19 | |
| 16 | 12 | (United Kingdom) Jim Clark | Lotus-Climax | 61 | + 14 Laps | 5 | |
| Ret | 17 | (United Kingdom) Graham Hill | BRM | 34 | Gearbox | 11 | |
| Ret | 19 | (United Kingdom) Ian Burgess | Cooper-Maserati | 29 | Ignition | 23 | |
| Ret | 21 | (United Kingdom) Brian Naylor | JBW-Maserati | 20 | Engine | 17 | |
| Ret | 16 | (United States) Dan Gurney | BRM | 18 | Blown core plug | 3 | |
| Ret | 4 | (United Kingdom) Ron Flockhart | Cooper-Climax | 11 | Transmission | 21 | |
| Ret | 6 | (United Kingdom) Tony Brooks | Cooper-Climax | 6 | Spun Off | 9 | |
| Ret | 11 | (United Kingdom) John Surtees | Lotus-Climax | 3 | Accident | 6 | |

== Additional information ==
This was the Formula One World Championship debut race for American drivers Jim Hall and Bob Drake.

== Final Championship standings ==
- **Bold text** indicates the World Champions.

Drivers' Championship standings

| | Pos | Driver | Points |
|---|---|---|---|
| | 1 | (Australia) **Jack Brabham** | 43 |
| | 2 | (New Zealand) Bruce McLaren | 34 (37) |
| 2 | 3 | (United Kingdom) Stirling Moss | 19 |
| | 4 | (United Kingdom) Innes Ireland | 18 |
| 2 | 5 | (United States) Phil Hill | 16 |

Constructors' Championship standings

| Pos | Constructor | Points |
|---|---|---|
| 1 | (United Kingdom) **Cooper-Climax** | 48 (58) |
| 2 | (United Kingdom) Lotus-Climax | 34 (37) |
| 3 | (Italy) Ferrari | 26 (27) |
| 4 | (United Kingdom) BRM | 8 |
| 5 | (United Kingdom) Cooper-Maserati | 3 |

- Notes: Only the top five positions are included for both sets of standings. Only the best 6 results counted towards each Championship. Numbers without parentheses are Championship points; numbers in parentheses are total points scored.

| Previous race: 1960 Italian Grand Prix | FIA Formula One World Championship; 1960 season | Next race: 1961 Monaco Grand Prix |
| Previous race: 1959 United States Grand Prix | United States Grand Prix | Next race: 1961 United States Grand Prix |
