= The Devil's Hairpin =

1957 film by Cornel Wilde

- Theatrical release poster
- Directed by: Cornel Wilde
- Screenplay by: James Edmiston; Cornel Wilde
- Produced by: Cornel Wilde
- Starring: Cornel Wilde; Jean Wallace; Mary Astor
- Cinematography: Daniel L. Fapp
- Edited by: Floyd Knudtson
- Music by: Van Cleave
- Production company: Theodora Productions
- Distributed by: Paramount Pictures
- Release date: October 4, 1957
- Running time: 83 minutes
- Country: United States
- Language: English
- Box office: $1 million (US)

The Devil's Hairpin is a 1957 American sports drama film written and directed by Cornel Wilde who also stars alongside Jean Wallace and Mary Astor. It was filmed Technicolor and VistaVision, and distributed by Paramount Pictures. The plot revolves around about car racing.

== Plot ==
Nick Jargin retired from auto racing undefeated. He is continually goaded by Mike Houston, a sportswriter, to come out of retirement and challenge the top racer of the day, Tony Botari, particularly after egotistically saying in an interview that Botari has no real competition now that he's out of the sport.

Nick's girlfriend is Kelly James, a health club instructor. Kelly wants to be married and have sex, and when a reluctant Nick introduces her to his mother, Mrs. Jargin wants nothing to do with him, blaming Nick for a racing accident that seriously injured her other son, Johnny.

Kelly is even urged by Nick's mother to leave him. She gives him an ultimatum, marry her or else. He declines, so she goes back to former boyfriend Danny Rhinegold, who now runs Botari's racing team.

In the 100-lap race that takes them along rural roads, Nick takes the lead, with his brother Johnny's help on the crew. Botari is nearly in an accident in the dangerous "Devil's Hairpin" turn, so Nick slows down to help Botari steer clear of it. A self-sacrificing gesture is rare for him, so after the race, Kelly accepts when Nick finally proposes to her.

== Cast ==
- Cornel Wilde as Nick Jargin
- Jean Wallace as Kelly James
- Mary Astor as Mrs. Jargin
- Arthur Franz as Danny Rhinegold
- Morgan Jones as Chico Martinez
- Gerald Milton as Houston
- Paul Fix as "Doc" Addams
- Larry Pennell as Johnny Jargin

== Production ==
Filming took place in March 1957. It was known as The Fastest Man on Earh.

The racing scenes were shot at Paramount Ranch Raceway.

== See also ==
- List of American films of 1957
