= The Fabulous Texan =

1947 film by Edward Ludwig

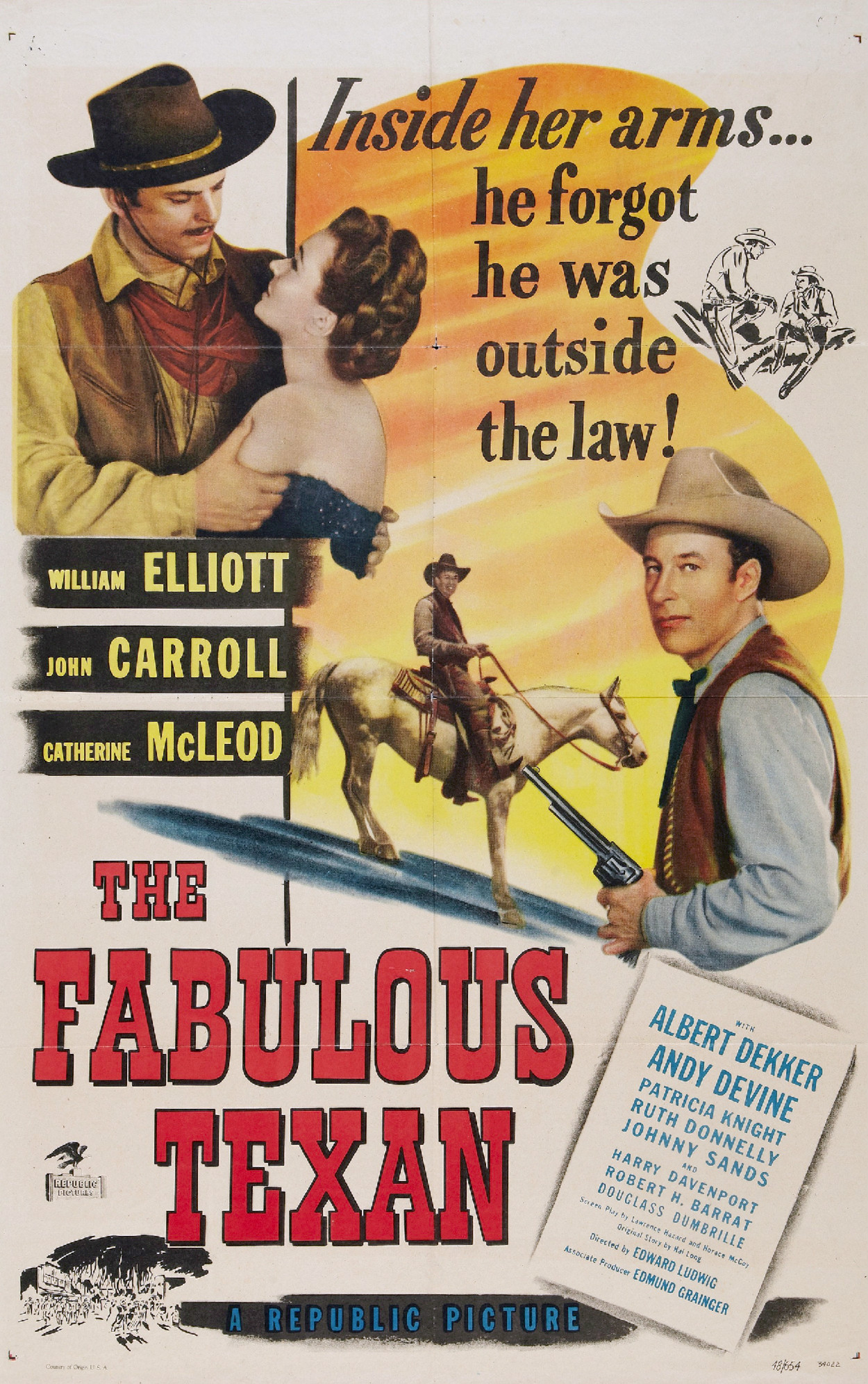
- Theatrical release poster
- Directed by: Edward Ludwig
- Screenplay by: Lawrence Hazard; Horace McCoy
- Story by: Hal Long
- Produced by: Edmund Grainger
- Starring: Wild Bill Elliott; John Carroll; Catherine McLeod; Albert Dekker; Andy Devine; Patricia Knight
- Cinematography: Reggie Lanning
- Edited by: Richard L. Van Enger
- Music by: Anthony Collins
- Production company: Republic Pictures
- Distributed by: Republic Pictures
- Release date: November 9, 1947
- Running time: 95 minutes
- Country: United States
- Language: English

The Fabulous Texan is a 1947 American Western film directed by Edward Ludwig and written by Lawrence Hazard and Horace McCoy. The film stars Wild Bill Elliott, John Carroll, Catherine McLeod, Albert Dekker, Andy Devine and Patricia Knight. The film was released on November 9, 1947, by Republic Pictures.

== Cast ==
- Wild Bill Elliott as Jim McWade
- John Carroll as John Wesley Baker
- Catherine McLeod as Alice Sharp
- Albert Dekker as Gibson Hart
- Andy Devine as Elihu Mills
- Patricia Knight as Josie Allen
- Ruth Donnelly as Utopia Mills
- Johnny Sands as Bud Clayton
- Harry Davenport as Rev. Baker
- Robert Barrat as Dr. Sharp
- Douglass Dumbrille as Luke Roland
- Reed Hadley as Jessup
- Roy Barcroft as Standifer
- Russell Simpson as Wade Clayton
- James Brown as Shep Clayton
- Jim Davis as Sam Bass
- George Beban Jr. as Dick Clayton
- John Miles as Sim Clayton
