= Cornel Wilde =

Hungarian-American actor and film director (1912–1989)

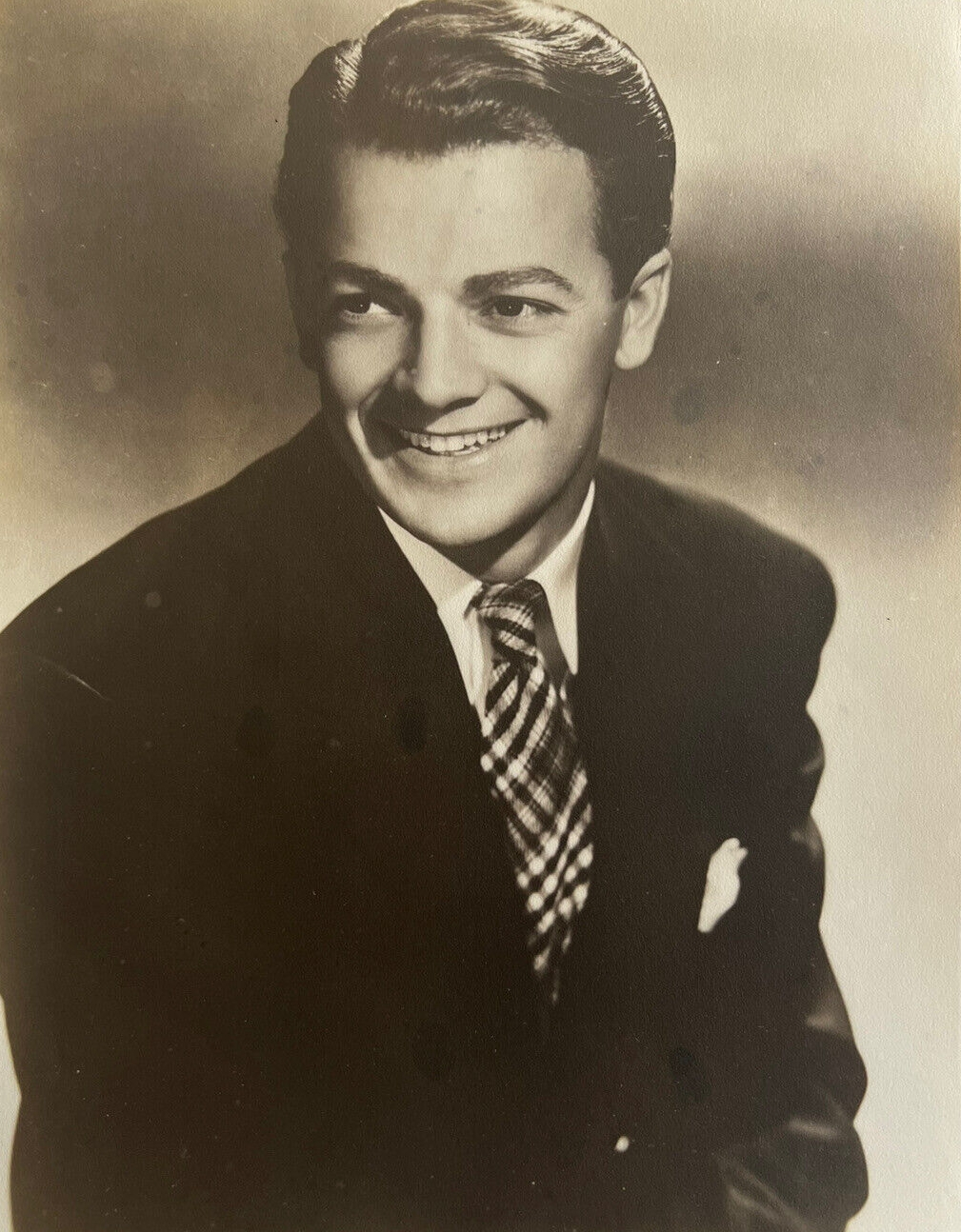
- Wilde in the 1940s
- Born: Kornél Lajos Weisz; October 13, 1912; Privigye, Kingdom of Hungary, Austria-Hungary (now Prievidza, Slovakia)
- Died: October 16, 1989 (aged 77); Los Angeles, California, U.S.
- Resting place: Westwood Memorial Park, Los Angeles, California
- Other names: Clark Wales, Jefferson Pascal
- Education: Columbia University
- Occupations: Actor; filmmaker
- Years active: 1935–1987
- Spouses: Patricia Knight (m. 1937; div. 1951) Jean Wallace (m. 1951; div. 1981)
- Children: 2

Cornelius Louis Wilde (born Kornél Lajos Weisz; October 13, 1912 – October 16, 1989) was a Hungarian-American actor and filmmaker. His acting career began on Broadway in 1935, followed by small, uncredited appearances in films. By the 1940s he had signed a contract with 20th Century Fox, and by the middle of the decade he was a major leading man. He was nominated for the Academy Award for Best Actor for his performance in 1945's A Song to Remember.

In the 1950s he moved to writing, producing and directing films, and still continued his career as an actor. His notable directorial efforts included The Naked Prey (1965), Beach Red (1967), and No Blade of Grass (1970). He also went into songwriting during his career.

== Early life ==
Wilde was born in 1912 in Privigye, Kingdom of Hungary (now Prievidza, Slovakia), although his year and place of birth are usually and inaccurately given as 1915 in New York City. Wilde's Hungarian Jewish parents were Vojtech Béla Weisz (anglicized to Louis Bela Wilde) and Renée Mary Vid (Rayna Miryam), and he was named Kornél Lajos after his paternal grandfather. The family emigrated to the United States via first class passage aboard a Dutch steamer in 1920, when Kornél was seven years old. His name was anglicized (as was commonly done at the time in the United States) to Cornelius Louis Wilde.

His father's job with a cosmetics firm meant that as a child he travelled in Europe, where he picked up several languages. Wilde entered Columbia University in New York City as a freshman in the fall of 1929. He fenced for the Columbia Lions fencing team, and won the National Novice Foils Championship held at the New York Athletic Club in 1929.

Wilde qualified for the United States fencing team for the 1936 Summer Olympic Games in Third Reich Berlin, but he quit the team before the games and took a role in the theater. In preparation for an acting career, he and his new wife Marjory Heinzen (later to be known as Patricia Knight) shaved years off their ages, three for him and five for her. As a result, most publicity records and subsequent sources wrongly indicate a 1915 birth for Wilde.

== Career ==
=== Theatre ===
After studying at Theodora Irvine's Studio of the Theatre, Wilde began appearing in plays in stock and in New York. He made his Broadway debut in 1935 in Moon Over Mulberry Street. He also appeared in Love Is Not So Simple, Daughters of Etreus, and Having Wonderful Time.

He did the illustrations for Fencing, a 1936 textbook on fencing and wrote a fencing play, Touché, under the pseudonym of Clark Wales in 1937. He toured with Tallulah Bankhead in a production of Antony and Cleopatra; during the run he married his co-star Patricia Knight.

Acting jobs were sporadic over the next few years. Wilde supplemented his income with exhibition fencing matches; his wife also did modelling work. Wilde wrote plays, some of which were performed by the New York Drama Guild.

Wilde was hired as a fencing teacher by Laurence Olivier for his 1940 Broadway production of Romeo and Juliet and was given the role of Tybalt in the production. Although the show had only a small run, his performance in this role netted him a Hollywood film contract with Warner Bros.

=== Films ===
Wilde had an uncredited bit part in Lady with Red Hair (1940), then got a small part in High Sierra (1941), which included a scene with Humphrey Bogart. He also had small roles in Knockout (1941) and Kisses for Breakfast (1941).

Signed by 20th Century Fox, he got above-title billing in The Perfect Snob (1941); studio publicity falsely claimed it was his first film. It was followed by a war movie, Manila Calling (1942). He was the romantic male lead in Life Begins at Eight-Thirty (1942), supporting Monty Woolley, and supported Sonja Henie in Wintertime (1943).

In 1945, Columbia Pictures began a search for someone to play the role of Frédéric Chopin in A Song to Remember. They eventually tested Wilde, and agreed to cast him in the role after some negotiation with Fox, who agreed to lend him to Columbia and one film a year for several years. Part of the deal involved Fox borrowing Alexander Knox from Columbia to appear in Wilson (1944). A Song to Remember was a big hit, made Wilde a star and earned him a nomination for an Academy Award for Best Actor.

Columbia promptly used him in two more films, both swashbucklers: as Aladdin in A Thousand and One Nights with Evelyn Keyes and as the son of Robin Hood in The Bandit of Sherwood Forest (made 1945, released 1946).

Back at Fox, he played the male lead in Leave Her to Heaven (1945), with Gene Tierney and Jeanne Crain, an enormous hit at the box office. Bandit was also a big hit when it was released.

In 1946, Wilde was voted the 18th-most popular star in the United States, and in 1947 the 25th-. Fox announced him for Enchanted Voyage. It ended up not being made; instead he was reunited with Crain in Fox's musical Centennial Summer (1946).

In January 1946, Wilde was suspended by Fox for refusing the male lead in Margie (1946). This suspension was soon lifted so Wilde could play the male lead in the studio's big budget version of Forever Amber (1947). (Note: The budget was estimated as over $3,000,000.) Filming started, then was halted when the studio decided to replace Peggy Cummins, the female star. In October 1946, Wilde refused to return to work unless he was paid more; his salary was $3,000 a week, with six years to run – he wanted $150,000 per film for two films per year. The parties came to an agreement and filming resumed. Wilde also appeared with Maureen O'Hara in The Homestretch (1947).

He was in a comedy at Columbia with Ginger Rogers, It Had to Be You (1947). At Fox he turned down a role in That Lady in Ermine (1948). Not wanting to go on suspension again he agreed to make The Walls of Jericho (1948), from the same director as Leave Her to Heaven but less popular. Road House (1948), for Fox, was a highly regarded film noir and a decent-sized hit. He then left Fox, which he later regarded as a mistake.

=== Freelance ===
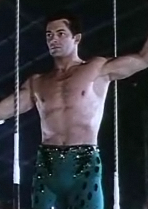
Wilde in The Greatest Show on Earth (1952)

At Columbia, Wilde was in Shockproof (1949), another noir, with his then-wife Patricia Knight. They appeared together in Western Wind, a play at the Cape Playhouse.

Wilde starred opposite Simone Signoret in Swiss Tour, aka Four Days' Leave (1949), a romantic comedy about American servicemen in Switzerland. He returned to Fox for Two Flags West (1950), then went to RKO for At Sword's Point (filmed in 1949, but not released until 1952), a swashbuckler with Maureen O'Hara.

Cast in a leading role, he played a trapeze artist in The Greatest Show on Earth (1952) for Cecil B. de Mille, an enormous ensemble cast hit.

At Columbia, he was in California Conquest (1952), a Western for producer Sam Katzman. He went over to Warner Bros. for Operation Secret (1952), then was back at Fox for Treasure of the Golden Condor (1952).

He focused on adventure stories: Saadia (1953) for MGM, Star of India (1954) for United Artists. He had a part in the all-star executive drama Woman's World (1954) for Fox, then went back to action and adventure with Passion (1954) for RKO.

== Producer and director ==
In the 1950s Wilde and his second wife, Jean Wallace, formed their own film production company, Theodora, named after Theodora Irvine. (Note: Film critic Tim Lucas states that the move made Wilde "only the second actor - after Burt Lancaster - to form his own production company, thus declaring himself a herdsman rather than cattle".) Wilde said "In the main, if an actor has reasonably sound judgment and a knowledge of the industry, and if he is a fair business man or has competent advisers, he's a fool not to produce independently if he can secure possible deals on that basis."

Their first movie was the film noir The Big Combo (1955), a co production with Security Pictures that was released through Allied Artists. Wilde and Wallace played the leads. That year he also directed an episode of General Electric Theatre. However he said he did not want to do too much television as he had more freedom with films.

That same year, he appeared in an episode of I Love Lucy as himself and starred in The Scarlet Coat (1956) for MGM.

Wilde produced and starred in another film for Theodora with Wallace, Storm Fear (1956) from a script by Horton Foote. This time Wilde also directed "to save money".

Theodora announced Wilde would play Lord Byron, but the film was never made. He later stated that not playing the part was one of his great regrets. Other announced projects included Curly and Second Act Curtin.

Wilde was meant to appear as Joshua in de Mille's The Ten Commandments (1956) but was not in the final film – he turned down the role, saying it was too small and the pay was too little (John Derek ended up playing it). Wilde later said it was his worst mistake because having even a small role in a big blockbuster would have given him career momentum.

As an actor only, he appeared in Hot Blood (1956) with Jane Russell for director Nicholas Ray, and Beyond Mombasa (1956), shot in Kenya; both were released by Columbia. In 1957, he guest-starred as himself in an episode of Father Knows Best titled "An Evening to Remember." Also in 1957, he played the role of the 11th century Persian poet Omar Khayyám in the film Omar Khayyam.

Wilde produced, directed and starred in two films for Theodora that were released through Paramount Pictures: The Devil's Hairpin (1957), a car-racing drama, and Maracaibo (1958). Wilde called them "an acceptable A-B, meaning a picture with a B budget but A pretensions".

He had the lead in Edge of Eternity (1959) for director Don Siegel. In 1959 it was announced he would produce and star in two films for Columbia, the first being Caves of the Night.

Wilde went to Italy to star in Constantine and the Cross (1962). In Britain, he wrote, produced, directed and starred in Lancelot and Guinevere (1963). The sets from the film were also used for the 1963 comedy film The Mouse on the Moon.

Wilde produced, directed, and starred in The Naked Prey (1965), in which he played a man stripped naked and chased by hunters from an African tribe that was affronted by the behavior of other members of his safari party. The original script was largely based on a true historical incident about a trapper named John Colter being pursued by Blackfeet Indians in Wyoming. Lower shooting costs, tax breaks, and material and logistical assistance offered by Rhodesia persuaded Wilde and the other producers to shoot the film on location in Rhodesia (now Zimbabwe). It is probably his most highly regarded film as director.

Wilde followed this with a war movie, Beach Red (1967), shot in the Philippines. He announced Namugongo, another movie in Africa, about the White Fathers missionaries in the Kingdom of Buganda, but it was never made. He had a supporting role in The Comic (1969), directed by Carl Reiner.

He wrote, produced, and directed the science fiction film No Blade of Grass (1970). (Note: Wilde's script contribution was credited under the pseudonym "Jefferson Pascal".) Later he wrote, directed, and starred in the exploitation film Sharks' Treasure, a 1975 film released during the "Shark Fever" of the mid-1970s in the wake of the success of Peter Benchley's Jaws. (Note: When pre-production began at Columbia Pictures in 1968, the film's working title was The Raging Sea, later altered to The Treasure. Sharks' Treasure was chosen by United Artists, who ultimately distributed it.)

At the end of the decade, he acted in The Norseman (1978) and The Fifth Musketeer (1979). On the small screen, Wilde appeared as an unethical surgeon in the 1971 Night Gallery episode "Deliveries in the Rear", and portrayed an anthropologist in the 1972 TV movie Gargoyles.

== Personal life ==
In 1937, he married actress Patricia Knight. She starred alongside him in Shockproof (1949). Their daughter, Wendy, was born on February 22, 1943. The family lived at Country House on Deep Canyon Road, Los Angeles. They divorced in 1951.

Five days after his divorce, he married actress Jean Wallace. Wilde became stepfather to Wallace's two sons, Pascal and Thomas, from her marriage to Franchot Tone. Their son, Cornel Wallace Wilde, was born on December 19, 1967. Wilde senior and Wallace starred together in several films including The Big Combo (1955), Lancelot and Guinevere (1963), and Beach Red (1967). They divorced in 1981.

At the time of his death in 1989 he was engaged to Colleen Conte, the widow of actor Richard Conte. Richard Conte had starred in Wilde's film The Big Combo.

Wilde expressed liberal views about race and homosexuality, and was proud of the anti-war message of Beach Red. His hobbies included riding, hunting and deep-sea fishing: in the 1960s he appeared on the TV show The American Sportsman shooting an Alaskan grizzly, but may have had a change of heart about bloodsports later in life.

== Death ==
Wilde died of leukemia on October 16, 1989, three days after his 77th birthday and just weeks after he had been diagnosed with the blood disease. He is interred in the Westwood Village Memorial Park Cemetery in Westwood, Los Angeles.

For his contribution to the motion picture industry, Cornel Wilde has a star on the Hollywood Walk of Fame at 1635 Vine Street.

== Filmography ==
=== Film ===
Year	Title	Role	Notes
1937	The Rhythm Party	Party Guest	Short film Uncredited
1937	Exclusive	Reporter	Uncredited
1940	Lady with Red Hair	Mr. Williams	Uncredited
1941	High Sierra	Louis Mendoza	
1941	Knockout	Tom Rossi	
1941	Kisses for Breakfast	Chet Oakley	
1941	The Perfect Snob	Mike Lord	
1942	Manila Calling	Jeff Bailey	
1942	Life Begins at Eight-Thirty	Robert Carter	
1943	Wintertime	Freddy Austin	
1945	A Song to Remember	Frédéric Chopin	
1945	A Thousand and One Nights	Aladdin	
1945	Leave Her to Heaven	Richard Harland	
1946	The Bandit of Sherwood Forest	Robert of Nottingham	
1946	Centennial Summer	Philippe Lascalles	
1947	The Homestretch	Jock Wallace	
1947	Forever Amber	Bruce Carlton	
1947	It Had to Be You	George McKesson/Johnny Blaine	
1947	Stairway for a Star	Jimmy Banks	Utilized scenes from an unfinished 1940 film
1948	The Walls of Jericho	Dave Connors	
1948	Road House	Pete Morgan	
1949	Shockproof	Griff Marat	
1950	Two Flags West	Captain Mark Bradford	
1952	The Greatest Show on Earth	The Great Sebastian	
1952	At Sword's Point	D'Artagnan Jr.	
1952	California Conquest	Don Arturo Bordega	
1952	Operation Secret	Peter Forrester	
1953	Treasure of the Golden Condor	Jean-Paul	
1953	Main Street to Broadway	Himself	
1953	Saadia	Si Lahssen	
1954	Star of India	Pierre St. Laurent	
1954	Woman's World	Bill Baxter	
1954	Passion	Juan Obreón	
1955	The Big Combo	Lieutenant Leonard Diamond	Also associate producer
1955	The Scarlet Coat	Major John Boulton	
1955	Storm Fear	Charlie Blake	Also director and producer
1956	Hot Blood	Stephano Torino	
1956	Beyond Mombasa	Matt Campbell	
1957	Omar Khayyam	Omar Khayyam	
1957	The Devil's Hairpin	Nick Jargin	Also director, writer and producer
1958	Maracaibo	Vic Scott	Also director and producer
1959	Edge of Eternity	Les Martin	
1961	Constantine and the Cross	Constantine	
1963	Lancelot and Guinevere	Sir Lancelot	Also director, writer (as Jefferson Pascal) and producer
1965	The Naked Prey	Man	Also director and producer
1967	Beach Red	Captain MacDonald	Also director, writer (as Jefferson Pascal) and producer
1969	The Comic	Frank Powers	
1970	No Blade of Grass	Radio Voice	Also director, writer (as Jefferson Pascal) and producer
1975	Sharks' Treasure	Jim Carnahan	Also director, writer and producer
1978	The Norseman	Ragnar	
1979	The Fifth Musketeer	Charles de Batz de Castelmore d'Artagnan	
1985	Flesh and Bullets	Police Captain	

=== Television ===
Year	Title	Role	Notes
1955	General Electric Theater	Peter Maresy	Episode "The Blond Dog"
1955	I Love Lucy	Himself	Episode "The Star Upstairs"
1956	Star Stage	Author	Episode "Screen Credit"
1957	Father Knows Best	Himself	Episode "An Evening to Remember"
1958	Alcoa Theatre	Damon Phillips	Episode "Coast to Coast"
1960	The Dinah Shore Chevy Show	Steve Roberts/German Captain/Count/Jaque/Sheik	Episode "Around the World with Nellie Bly"
1961	General Electric Theater	Rudy Alberti	Episode "The Great Alberti"
1972	Night Gallery	Dr. John Fletcher	Episode "Deliveries in the Rear"
1972	Gargoyles	Dr. Mercer Boley	Television film
1978	Fantasy Island	Daring Danny Ryan	Episode "Charlie's Cherubs/Stalag 3"
1983	The Love Boat	Edgar Dolan	Episode "Youth Takes a Holiday/Don't Leave Home Without It/Prisoner of Love"
1986	The New Mike Hammer	George Burnett	Episode "Mike's Baby"
1987	Murder, She Wrote	Duncan Barnett	Episode "The Way to Dusty Death"

== Radio appearances ==
Year	Program	Episode/source
1946	Screen Guild Players	"Wuthering Heights"
1952	Hollywood Star Playhouse	"The End of Aunt Edlia"
1953	Cavalcade of America	"Down Brake"
1953	Suspense	"The Mystery of Marie Roget"
1954	Suspense	"Somebody Help Me"

== Bibliography ==
- Coen, John (1970). "Producer/Director: Cornel Wilde". Film Comment. 6 (1): 52–61. JSTOR 43451108.
