= Patricia Knight =

American actress

- Born: Marjorie Heinzen; April 28, 1915
- Died: October 26, 2004 (aged 89); Hemet, California, U.S.
- Occupation: Actress
- Years active: 1947–1954
- Spouses: Cornel Wilde (m. 1937; div. 1951) Niels Larson (m. 1954; died 1971) David Wright (died 1996)
- Children: 1

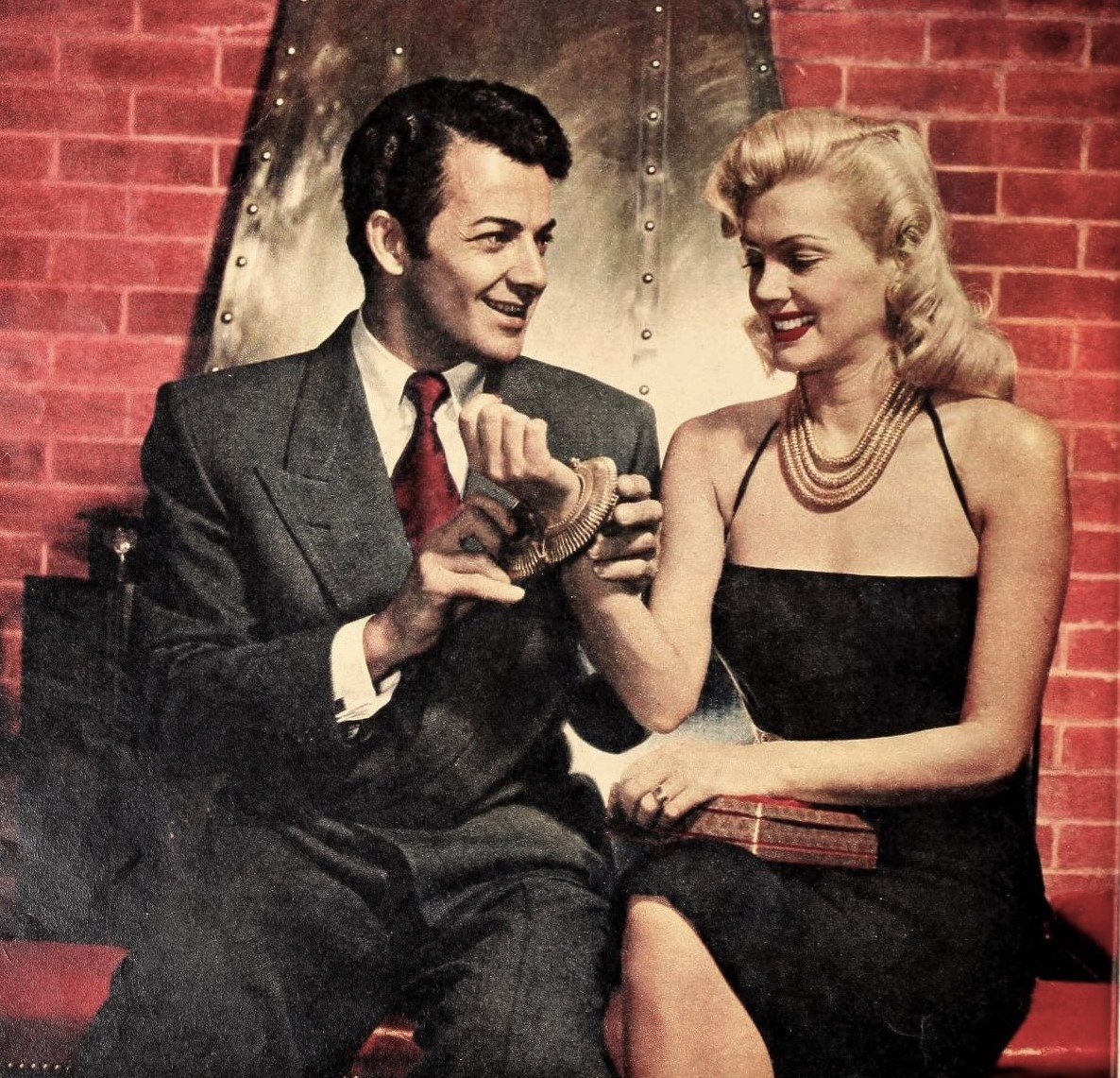
Cornel Wilde and Patricia Knight, 1946

Patricia Knight (born Marjorie Heinzen; April 28, 1915 – October 26, 2004) was an American actress who appeared in a few movies in the late 1940s and early 1950s.

== Career ==
In 1949, Knight and her husband, Cornel Wilde, acted at Cape Playhouse in a production of Western Wind. The same year they costarred in the Sam Fuller written and Douglas Sirk directed film noir Shockproof for Columbia.

== Personal life ==
After meeting actor Cornel Wilde at a producer's office in 1936, the couple married in Elkton, Maryland, on September 1, 1937. They had one daughter, Wendy, and divorced on August 30, 1951. The family lived at Country House on Deep Canyon Road, Los Angeles. She married Danish businessman Niels Larson on October 24, 1954, and moved with him to Europe.

She and Larson returned to the United States in 1969. Larson died in 1971. She later married building adviser David Wright, and moved with him to Hemet, California, where he died on May 22, 1996. Patricia Knight died in Hemet in 2004, aged 89.

== Filmography ==
1. The Fabulous Texan (1947) as Josie Allen
2. Roses are Red (1947) as Jill Carney
3. Shockproof (1949) as Jenny Marsh
4. The Second Face (1950) as Lynn Hamilton
5. The Magic Face (1951) as Vera Janus
6. The Lone Wolf (1954) as Janice Avon
