= Lancelot and Guinevere =

1963 British medieval fantasy adventure film by Cornel Wilde

- Theatrical poster
- Directed by: Cornel Wilde
- Written by: Richard Schayer; Cornel Wilde (as Jefferson Pascal)
- Produced by: Bernard Luber; Cornel Wilde
- Starring: Cornel Wilde; Jean Wallace; Brian Aherne
- Cinematography: Harry Waxman
- Edited by: Frederick Wilson
- Music by: Ron Goodwin
- Distributed by: Universal-International Films
- Release dates: 2 June 1963 (UK); 5 June 1963 (US)
- Running time: 116 minutes
- Country: United Kingdom
- Language: English
- Budget: $3 million or £690,970

Lancelot and Guinevere (known as Sword of Lancelot in the U.S.) is a British 1963 medieval fantasy adventure film starring Cornel Wilde, Jean Wallace (his real-life wife at the time), and Brian Aherne. This lesser-known version of the Camelot legend is a work shaped predominantly by Cornel Wilde, who co-produced, directed, co-wrote, and played Lancelot.

== Plot ==
Lancelot is King Arthur's most valued Knight of the Round Table and a paragon of courage and virtue. Things change, however, when he falls in love with Queen Guinevere. A sub-plot concerns Arthur's effort to forestall a challenge from a rival king, a problem that will inevitably catch Lancelot up in a personal conflict.

In order to marry Guinevere, King Leodogran's daughter, King Arthur must find a knight to defeat Leodogran's champion. Arthur chooses Lancelot, who mortally wounds his opponent. On the way back to Camelot, Lancelot foils an attempt on Guinevere's life by Sir Modred, Arthur's illegitimate son; and before the end of the journey, Lancelot and Guinevere realize their love for each other. Though Lancelot is loyal to Arthur and Guinevere's marriage to the King takes place as planned, it is not long before the two become lovers.

Modred spies on them and informs Arthur of his wife's infidelity. Lancelot escapes, but Guinevere is condemned to be burned at the stake. He returns in time to save her and then offers to give himself up provided there will be no retaliation. Nevertheless, Arthur banishes him and sends Guinevere to a convent. Years later, Modred murders Arthur for his throne, and Lancelot returns to defeat him, thus ending the civil war that has been raging in Britain. He then finds Guinevere about to take the vows of a nun.

== Cast ==
- Cornel Wilde as Sir Lancelot
- Jean Wallace as Guinevere
- Brian Aherne as King Arthur
- George Baker as Sir Gawaine
- Archie Duncan as Sir Lamorak
- Adrienne Corri as Lady Vivian
- Michael Meacham as Sir Modred
- Iain Gregory as Sir Tors
- Mark Dignam as Merlin
- Reginald Beckwith as Sir Dagonet
- John Barrie as Sir Bevidere
- Richard Thorp as Sir Gareth
- Joseph Tomelty as Sir Kaye
- Graham Stark as Rian
- Walter Gotell as Sir Cedric
- Christopher Rhodes as Ulfus
- Peter Prowse as Brandagorous
- John Longden as King Leodogran

== Production ==
Many of the sets used for the film would later be used for the film The Mouse on the Moon.

== Comic book adaption ==
- Dell Movie Classic: Lancelot and Guinevere (October 1963)
