= The Magic Face =

1951 film

- Theatrical release poster
- Directed by: Frank Tuttle
- Written by: Mort Briskin; Robert Smith
- Produced by: Mort Briskin; Robert Smith
- Starring: Luther Adler; Patricia Knight; William L. Shirer; Jaspar von Oertzen; Anton Mitterwurzer; Peter Preses
- Cinematography: Tony Braun
- Edited by: Henrietta Brunsch
- Music by: Herschel Burke Gilbert
- Production company: Mort Briskin-Robert Smith Productions
- Distributed by: Columbia Pictures
- Release date: August 8, 1951 (Memphis, Tennessee)
- Running time: 88 minutes
- Countries: United States; Austria
- Language: English

The Magic Face is a 1951 American drama film directed by Frank Tuttle, written by Mort Briskin and Robert Smith and starring Luther Adler, and Patricia Knight. The film was released on August 8, 1951 by Columbia Pictures.

== Cast ==
- Luther Adler as Rudi Janus / Janus the Great / Adolf Hitler
- Patricia Knight as Vera Janus
- William L. Shirer as Himself
- Jaspar von Oertzen as Maj. Fritz Weinrich
- Anton Mitterwurzer as Hans
- Peter Preses as Warden Harbacker
- Manfred Inger as Heinrich Wagner
- Charles Koenig as Franz
- Rolf Wanka as Gen. Rodenbusch
- Oskar Willner as Gen. von Schlossen
- Bell as Gen. Haldes
- Eric Zuckmann as Heinrich Himmler
- Hermann Erhardt as Hermann Göring
- Hans Sheel as Gen. Steig
- Michael Tellering as Lt. Col. Heitmeier
- Erik Frey as Col. Raffenstein
- Heinz Moog as Hans Harbach
- Ilka Windish as Carla Harbach
- Annie Maier as Mariana

== Production ==
Columbia Pictures rushed the production of the film so that it could be released before Twentieth Century-Fox's The Desert Fox: The Story of Rommel.

== Reception ==
In a contemporary review for The New York Times, critic Bosley Crowther wrote: "[T]he cock-and-bull story that unfolds smacks of nothing more firmly reliable than the vaporing of a script-writer's brain. And, as a piece of free-flight romancing, it ranks somewhere between 'The Count of Monte Cristo' and 'Hitler—the Beast of Berlin.' [sic] ... More than the story is fantastic. The way that it is played, under Frank Tuttle's unrestrained direction, is beyond fairly rational belief. Luther Adler, who portrays both the actor and the unlamented boss of the Third Reich, throws himself into this nonsense with the affected seriousness of a smalltime vaudeville 'ham,' and Peter Preses, who plays the prison warden—which is the next most important role—gives out with such snorting and sneering that you'd think he had jumped out of a melodrama of the first World War. ... Says Mr. Shirer, in conclusion, 'an amazing story, almost beyond belief—and yet it is difficult not to believe it.' That's what you think, Mr. S. !"
