= Shockproof =

1949 film by Douglas Sirk

- Theatrical release poster
- Directed by: Douglas Sirk
- Written by: Helen Deutsch; Samuel Fuller
- Starring: Cornel Wilde
- Cinematography: Charles Lawton Jr.
- Edited by: Gene Havlick
- Music by: George Duning
- Color process: Black and white
- Production company: Columbia Pictures
- Distributed by: Columbia Pictures
- Release date: January 20, 1949
- Running time: 80 minutes
- Country: United States
- Language: English

Shockproof is a 1949 American crime film noir directed by Douglas Sirk and starring Patricia Knight and Cornel Wilde. Wilde and Knight were husband and wife during filming. They divorced in 1951.

== Plot ==
Griff Marat (Cornel Wilde) is a parole officer who falls in love with a parolee, Jenny Marsh (Patricia Knight). Marsh had gone to prison in order to protect Harry Wesson (John Baragrey), a gambler with whom she was having an affair.

Warned to steer clear of Harry permanently, Jenny disobeys, still feeling loyal to him. A raid on Harry's bookie joint while Jenny is there costs her the job Griff has found for her. Out of concern for her welfare, Griff hires Jenny as a caretaker for his blind mother (Esther Minciotti).

Griff has political ambitions that Harry would like to ruin, so, knowing it is against regulations for the parolee and parole officer to be involved, Harry encourages Jenny to accept Griff's romantic advances. Jenny knows the regulations too, but realizes she loves Griff, and they get married; she makes one more trip to speak to Harry, to tell him that she truly loves Griff. During their conversation, Harry threatens to reveal letters she had written him, in which she expressed her love. Jenny points Harry's own gun at him and, after a brief struggle, he ends up shot and seriously wounded. Griff and Jenny attempt to flee to Mexico. This fails. Willing to do anything to keep his wife from going back to jail, Griff takes a job in an oil refinery. Their photographs regularly appear in newspapers, but the last straw for Jenny is when a paper that includes their pictures is delivered to every neighbor in their refinery community. The couple decides to go back and turn themselves in. When the police take them to Harry in the hospital, he clears Jenny's name by swearing that the shooting was an accident.

== Cast ==
- Cornel Wilde as Griff Marat
- Patricia Knight as Jenny Marsh
- John Baragrey as Harry Wesson
- Esther Minciotti as Mrs. Marat
- Howard St. John as Sam Brooks
- Russell Collins as Frederick Bauer
- Charles Bates as Tommy Marat
- Arthur Space as police inspector at hospital (uncredited)
- Gilbert Barnett as Barry (uncredited)

== Background ==
The director of Shockproof, Douglas Sirk, said he took the assignment because the film dealt with one of his favorite themes: the price of flouting taboos.

In Samuel Fuller's original script, the film ended with a violent rebellion by Marat against the system that kept him and Marsh apart. The studio had National Velvet scriptwriter Helen Deutsch step in to pen a soft-suds rewrite.

A number of Fuller's screenplays, including The Naked Kiss, The Baron of Arizona, House of Bamboo, Forty Guns, The Big Red One, and this film, featured a lead character called Griff.

== Reception ==
E. Gonzalez wrote in Slant Magazine: "Sirk’s direction is disenchanted at times, and the script, a labyrinthine tale of emotional manipulation, feels tamed of its archness."

A New York Times writer, Matt Zoller Seitz, discussed the significance of Shockproof in 2007 when the film received its first theatrical showing in New York City:

...while Shockproof will inspire more groans than gasps, it's essential viewing for fans of Mr. Fuller and Mr. Sirk—and that's why the Two Boots Pioneer Theater and an online film discussion group teamed up to give this critically and financially unsuccessful movie its first New York run. The lurid setup and obsessive-loner-versus-the-system mechanics are pure Samuel Fuller. Mr. Sirk's personality is expressed in the film's affection for its screwed-up characters, in the poetic deployment of mirrors, windows and stairways, and in the low-angled wide shots of Griff's house, a space that seems both nurturing and oppressive."

== Trivia ==
The British serial killer John Straffen committed a murder on the way to see Shockproof at the cinema in 1951.

Shockproof includes brief interior scenes of the Bradbury Building, where the parole bureau's offices and doctor's office are supposed to be located, but the in-office scenes, which include unimpaired views of the Hall of Justice and the demolished Hall of Records, appear to have been filmed in offices of Los Angeles City Hall facing west onto N. Spring Street, several blocks north of the Bradbury.
