= Jean Wallace =

American actress (1923–1990)

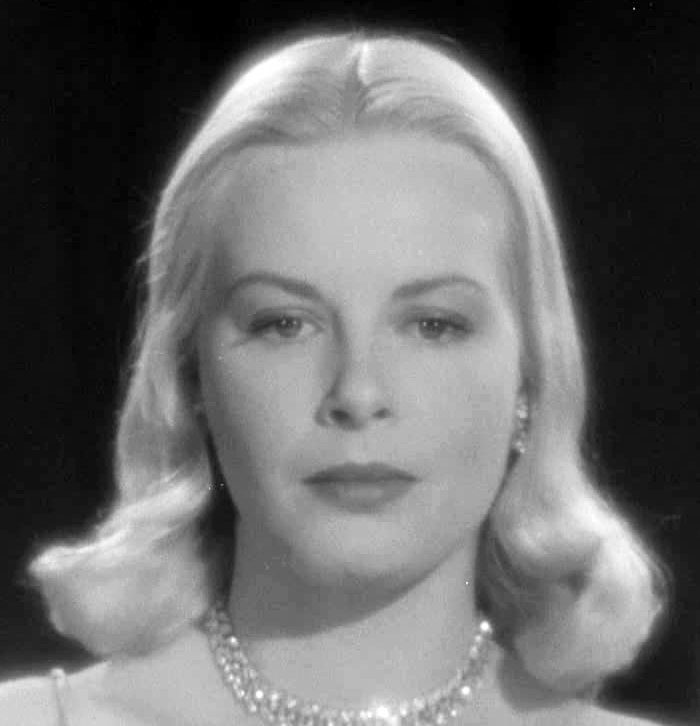
- Wallace in The Big Combo (1955)
- Born: Jean Walasek; October 12, 1923; Chicago, Illinois, U.S.
- Died: February 14, 1990 (aged 66); Los Angeles, California, U.S.
- Occupation: Actress
- Years active: 1941–1970
- Spouses: Franchot Tone (m. 1941; div. 1948) Jim Lloyd Randall (m. 1950; annul. 1950) Cornel Wilde (m. 1951; div. 1981)
- Children: 3

Jean Wallace (born Jean Walasek or Wallasek; October 12, 1923 – February 14, 1990) was an American television and film actress.

== Early life ==
Wallace was born on October 12, 1923, in Chicago, Illinois, to John T. Walaszek and Mary A. Walaszek (née Sharkey). Her grandfather Karol Walaszek emigrated from Galicia. She was Polish-American.

Wallace graduated from Austin High School in Chicago before the family moved to Hollywood in 1940.

== Career ==
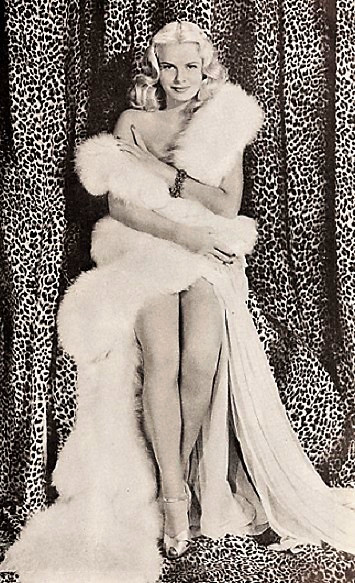
Wallace in 1942

Wallace was a dancer, singer, and showgirl for Earl Carroll. She signed with Paramount Pictures and had her first feature role in Louisiana Purchase.

== Personal life ==
Wallace married her Jigsaw costar Franchot Tone on October 18, 1941 in Yuma, Arizona. They had two sons, Pascal "Pat" Franchot Tone, born July 29, 1943, and Thomas Jefferson Tone, born September 16, 1945. Wallace and Tone divorced in 1948, and Tone was awarded custody of their sons. Wallace challenged that status in 1950 because of Tone's relationship with actress Barbara Payton, but a judge in Santa Monica, California, ruled that Tone would retain custody.

Wallace attempted suicide in 1946 by ingesting sleeping pills. In 1949, she again attempted suicide with a self-inflicted knife wound, causing her to be replaced by Ella Raines as the star of A Dangerous Profession.

In 1950, Wallace married former U.S. Army captain Jim Lloyd Randall, but the marriage was annulled later that year.

Wallace's third marriage was to actor Cornel Wilde, her costar in The Big Combo, Storm Fear, Lancelot and Guinevere, Sword of Lancelot and Beach Red, from 1951 to 1981. She and Wilde had one son, Cornel Wallace Wilde, born on December 19, 1967.

She sang the theme song from the movie Beach Red, which Wilde produced and directed as well as starred in.

Wallace died from a gastrointestinal hemorrhage on February 14, 1990 at the age of 66.

== Filmography ==
Film
Year	Film	Role	Notes
1941	Ziegfeld Girl	Ziegfeld girl	Uncredited
1941	Glamour Boy	Girl	Uncredited
1941	Louisiana Purchase	Louisiana Belle	
1943	Salute for Three	Hostess offering Buzz apple from basket	
1944	You Can't Ration Love	Madge	
1946	It Shouldn't Happen to a Dog	Bess Williams	
1947	Blaze of Noon	Poppy	
1948	When My Baby Smiles at Me	Sylvia Marco	Uncredited
1949	Jigsaw	Barbara Whitfield	Alternative title: Gun Moll
1949	The Man on the Eiffel Tower	Edna Wallace	
1950	The Good Humor Man	Bonnie Conroy	
1951	Native Son	Mary Dalton	Alternative title: Sangre negra
1954	Star of India	Katrina	Alternative title: Stella dell'India
1955	The Big Combo	Susan Lowell	
1955	Storm Fear	Elizabeth	
1957	The Devil's Hairpin	Kelly James	
1958	Maracaibo	Laura Kingsley	
1963	Lancelot and Guinevere	Guinevere	Alternative title: Sword of Lancelot
1967	Beach Red	Julie MacDonald	Appears in flashback photos; sings the title song
1970	No Blade of Grass	Ann Custance	(Last appearance)
Television
Year	Title	Role	Notes
1952	Schlitz Playhouse of Stars		1 episode
1955	General Electric Theater	Leslie Mason	1 episode
