= Star of India (film) =

1954 film

- Directed by: Arthur Lubin
- Written by: Denis Freeman; Herbert Dalmas; John H. Kafka
- Produced by: Raymond Stross
- Starring: Cornel Wilde; Jean Wallace; Herbert Lom
- Cinematography: C.M. Pennington-Richards
- Edited by: Russell Lloyd
- Music by: Nino Rota
- Color process: Technicolor
- Production companies: Raymond Stross Productions; Titanus
- Distributed by: Eros Films; Titanus Distribuzione; United Artists (US)
- Release date: 29 March 1954
- Running time: 92 minutes
- Countries: United Kingdom; Italy
- Language: English

Star of India (Italian: Stella Dell'India) is a 1954 British-Italian swashbuckling adventure film directed by Arthur Lubin and starring Cornel Wilde, Jean Wallace, Herbert Lom, and Walter Rilla. It was shot at the Riverside Studios in London and on location in Aosta. The film's sets were designed by the art director Cedric Dawe. It was released in the United States in April 1956 by United Artists.

== Plot ==
In seventeenth century France, Pierre St. Laurent, a young nobleman, returns home from the war to discover his lands and chateau have been confiscated by Narbonne, the governor of the province, and sold to Katrina, a Dutch widow.

Katrina agrees to return Pierre's land if he will help her recover the "Star of India," a sapphire that Narbonne stole from the Dutch. Pierre goes to Narbonne's castle while King Louis XIV is visiting, and befriends the King's mistress, Mme. de Montespan. She tells him that Narbonne keeps the Star of India in the hilt of his sword.

Pierre provokes Narbonne into challenging him to a duel, disarms him and steals the jewel. He escapes and returns the jewel to Katrina. To protect Katrina, Pierre allows himself to be captured, then escapes and joins Katrina on a ship bound for Holland.

Narbonne and his men catch up with them on the ship, but Pierre kills Narbonne in a duel.

== Cast ==
- Cornel Wilde as Pierre St. Laurent
- Jean Wallace as Katrina
- Herbert Lom as Narbonne
- Yvonne Sanson as Madamoiselle de Montespan
- John Slater as Emile
- Walter Rilla as Van Horst
- Basil Sydney as Louis XIV
- Arnold Bell as Captain
- Leslie Linder as Moulai

== Production ==
The film was based on a script by Herbert Dalmas which was optioned by British producer Raymond Stross. Stross arrived in Hollywood in March 1953 seeking directors and a star. Arthur Lubin signed and went to Britain to make the film the following month. The cast was to be Cornel Wilde, Herbert Lom and Robert Morley as Louis XIV. Wilde's then wife Jean Wallace was also cast.

It was to be the first British widescreen film with Eros agreeing to distribute in the east and United Artists in the West.

Stross said: "We in England can benefit by using a blend of American and English talent in pictures. The results will be better box office in this country and the mutual understanding developed will also be beneficial. You unquestionably will have much to offer us in techniques and may we modestly assume that we will supply stimuli for you." Cornel Wilde claimed he had brought the story to Stross, specifically as a vehicle for himself and Wallace. He also said the script was written by Seton I. Miller, although Miller is not credited.)

Eventually Morley dropped out and was replaced by Basil Sydney. Filming was pushed back. Lubin arrived in England in May and filming started in Italy in June 1953. There was filming at Riverside Studios in London then two weeks of location work in Devon. It was completed by late September 1953.

Director Arthur Lubin called the film "a disaster. Wilde wrote the script, he wanted to act, he wanted to direct. We had a producer who had never made a movie before, and I was stuck in the middle of Italy with a bad script".

20th Century Fox claimed they had rights to the title but later relinquished it at the request of Wilde, who had 55% of the western hemisphere profits.

The film was produced in several versions. Release of the film was delayed due to Wilde's unhappiness that the film did not present his wife in the best light. He sued to restrain release of the film until revisions were made. United Artists agreed to finance money to re-dub and re-score the film.

The budget was £133,185 plus an Italian budget (35,689,000 lire) and a dollar budget in covered star Wilde and director Lubin.

== Reception ==
The film was not released in the US until 1956. Bosley Crowther in The New York Times said it had a "silly script" but also ""countless costumes, swordplay and high speed horseback riding."

Diabolique magazine wrote the film "should have been good – it has Italian locations and Cornel Wilde had appeared in some decent swashbucklers – but is sunk by a silly script."
