= Passion (1954 film) =

1954 film by Allan Dwan

- Theatrical release poster
- Directed by: Allan Dwan
- Screenplay by: Howard Estabrook; Beatrice A. Dresher; Joseph Lejtes
- Story by: Beatrice A. Dresher; Miguel Padilla; Joseph Lejtes
- Produced by: Benedict Bogeaus
- Starring: Cornel Wilde; Yvonne De Carlo; Raymond Burr; Lon Chaney Jr. Rodolfo Acosta; John Qualen
- Cinematography: John Alton
- Edited by: Carlo Lodato
- Music by: Louis Forbes
- Production company: Benedict Bogeaus Production
- Distributed by: RKO Pictures
- Release date: October 6, 1954
- Running time: 84 minutes
- Country: United States
- Language: English

Passion is a 1954 American Western film directed by Allan Dwan and written by Howard Estabrook, Beatrice A. Dresher and Joseph Lejtes. The film stars Cornel Wilde, Yvonne De Carlo, Raymond Burr, Lon Chaney Jr., Rodolfo Acosta and John Qualen. The film was released on October 6, 1954, by RKO Pictures.

== Plot ==
A greedy California land baron stakes a claim to the property of Gaspar Melo, sending hired guns to seize control. A rancher, Juan Obreon, learns that Melo's granddaughter Rosa has given birth to a baby. Juan is the child's father and intends to marry Rosa, but she is forced to hide her new son before hired gun Sandro shoots her.

Rosa has a sister, Tonya, who flees before Sandro or his man Castro can find her. Captain Rodriguez, a friend of Juan's, becomes involved when Juan seeks vengeance for Rosa by killing the new land owner's men. Thanks to the captain's intervention, Juan is able to live in peace with Tonya and his child.

== Cast ==
- Cornel Wilde as Juan Obreon
- Yvonne De Carlo as Rosa Melo / Tonya Melo
- Raymond Burr as Captain Rodriguez
- Lon Chaney Jr. as Castro
- Rodolfo Acosta as Salvator Sandro
- John Qualen as Gaspar Melo
- Anthony Caruso as Sergeant Muñoz
- Richard Hale as Don Dominqo
- Robert Warwick as Padre
- John Dierkes as Escobar
- Alex Montoya as Manuel
- James Kirkwood Sr. as Don Rosendo
- Frank de Kova as Martinez

== Production ==
The film was known as Where the Wind Dies. Cornel Wilde's casting was announced in March 1954 with Benedict Bogeaus to produce for Filmcrest Productions and Harmon Jones to direct. Yvonne De Carlo signed to play his co-star.

Eventually Dwan directed. It was one of a series of movies Allan Dwan made for producer Benedict Bogeaus. The director said:

I didn't think much of the story – it was a contrived affair, but the shooting was one of our shrewd business manipulations. We rented magnificent Spanish sets Warner Bros, had built for some big picture, and then we moved over to Universal and used a lot of their sets. So we got a magnificent production for very little money.
