= Jaspar von Oertzen =

German actor

- Born: 2 January 1912; Schwerin, Mecklenburg German Empire
- Died: 22 April 2008 (aged 96); Munich, Bavaria, Germany
- Occupation: Actor
- Years active: 1934–1992 (film & TV)

Jaspar von Oertzen (1912–2008) was a German stage, film and television actor.

== Selected filmography ==
- Trouble with Jolanthe (1934)
- Comrades at Sea (1938)
- The Merciful Lie (1939)
- Police Report (1939)
- Bismarck (1940)
- Trenck the Pandur (1940)
- Riding for Germany (1941)
- Münchhausen (1943)
- The Golden Spider (1943)
- Young Hearts (1944)
- The Silent Guest (1945)
- Kolberg (1945)
- The Magic Face (1951)
- Monks, Girls and Hungarian Soldiers (1952)
- The Last Waltz (1953)
- A Song Goes Round the World (1958)

== Bibliography ==
- Giesen, Rolf. Nazi Propaganda Films: A History and Filmography. McFarland, 2003.
