= Hot Blood =

1956 film

- Theatrical release poster
- Directed by: Nicholas Ray
- Screenplay by: Jesse Lasky Jr.
- Story by: Jean Evans
- Produced by: Harry Tatelman; Howard Welsch
- Starring: Jane Russell; Cornel Wilde; Luther Adler; Joseph Calleia
- Cinematography: Ray June
- Edited by: Otto Ludwig
- Music by: Les Baxter
- Production company: Columbia Pictures
- Distributed by: Columbia Pictures
- Release date: March 7, 1956
- Running time: 85 minutes
- Country: United States
- Language: English

Hot Blood is a 1956 American CinemaScope Technicolor musical film directed by Nicholas Ray and starring Jane Russell, Cornel Wilde and Joseph Calleia. It was produced and distributed by Columbia Pictures.

== Plot ==
Marco Torino, king of the gypsies in southern California, is terminally ill. He wants his younger brother to succeed him, but Stephano is determined to become a dancer instead.

After turning a potential employer against him, Marco arranges a marriage for his brother to Annie Caldash, another gypsy. Stephano angers Annie's father Theodore and brother Xano by resisting Annie's charms and refusing to marry her, as he loves Velma.

Annie comes up with a scheme. Her father wants her to be paid a rich dowry from Stephano's family, then run off before the marriage. Stephano's brother is trying to raise money for a trip to "the promised land." She persuades Stephano to stage a phony wedding at which she will faint during the ceremony, whereupon they will split the dowry and teach their greedy relatives a lesson. But it is Stephano whom she ends up fooling, by going through with the marriage.

An angry Stephano leaves with Velma, finding work in cheap dance clubs. He begins to miss Annie. He returns to the gypsy camp to find Marco and her together, surprisingly happy. Mistakenly believing they are now together and pulling a swindle, Stephano objects, but Marco explains that he is merely enjoying the last precious days of his life. Stephano agrees to become the new gypsy king, with Annie his queen.

== Cast ==
- Jane Russell as Annie Caldash
- Cornel Wilde as Stephano Torino
- Luther Adler as Marco Torino
- Joseph Calleia as Papa Theodore
- James H. Russell as Xano
- Nina Koshetz as Nita Johnny
- Helen Westcott as Velma
- Mikhail Rasumny as Old Johnny
- Wally Russell as Bimbo

Unbilled players include Richard Deacon and Robert Foulk, and Ross Bagdasarian and Les Baxter appear uncredited as gas station attendants.

== Background ==
The film's working title was Tambourine. Jean Evans was the pen name of Jean Abrams, Ray's first wife. In 1949, Ray himself wrote a treatment based on Evans' research on gypsies in New York City's Lower East Side for RKO. In 1951, Ray worked on a script called No Return with writer Walter Newman about urban gypsies. Columbia finally agreed to make the film, but insisted that the script be re-written. Ray then worked with Jesse Lasky, Jr. as his writer on a new screenplay which became Hot Blood. Ray had wanted producer Gabriel Pascal to play "Marco Torino," the King of the Gypsies, but Pascal died before the film was made. According to modern sources, Ray also considered Edward G. Robinson for the role, which eventually was portrayed by Luther Adler, a veteran of the Group Theater. Modern sources also add that choreographer Matt Mattox substituted for Cornel Wilde during the dances.
