= Sharks' Treasure =

1975 American adventure film by Cornel Wilde

- Directed by: Cornel Wilde
- Written by: Cornel Wilde
- Produced by: Cornel Wilde
- Starring: Cornel Wilde; Yaphet Kotto
- Cinematography: Jack Atcheler
- Edited by: Byron 'Buzz' Brandt
- Music by: Robert O. Ragland
- Color process: DeLuxe Color
- Production company: Symbol Productions Inc.
- Distributed by: United Artists
- Release date: April 1, 1975
- Running time: 95 minutes
- Country: United States
- Language: English
- Box office: $2 million

Sharks' Treasure is a 1975 American adventure film written, produced and directed by Cornel Wilde and starring Cornel Wilde and Yaphet Kotto.

== Plot ==
Eccentric charter skipper Jim Carnahan (Cornel Wilde) and his team of hard-luck dreamers battle sharks, bandits and their own greed to recover sunken treasure off the coast of Honduras.

== Cast ==
- Cornel Wilde as Jim Carnahan
- Yaphet Kotto as Ben Flynn
- John Neilson as Ron
- Cliff Osmond as Lobo
- David Canary as Larry
- David Gilliam as Juanito

== Production ==
Wilde says he came up with the idea for the film in 1969 but could not raise the finance until Jaws. "I would rather have had the field to ourselves, without Jaws," he said.

He called the film "a very down to earth treasure hunting story of today... It shows guys who get hooked on to a real find, hock everything they have, give up jobs... The characters and incidents are based on a lot of true accounts."

Much of the film was shot near Bonaire in the Dutch Antilles.

"It was the most dangerous picture I've ever worked on," said Wilde. "Working 70 feet underwater, surrounded by sharks, you're pressured by all sorts of possible hazards... but I was much more excited than I was afraid."

== Release ==
The film opened in Florida through United Artists on April 18, 1975. It grossed $385,000 from about 100 screens in its opening weekend.

== Reception ==
The Los Angeles Times called the film "crude, violent, energetic and usual."

After seven weeks of release in three major markets in the United States, including California and Florida, the film had grossed $2 million.

== "Money, Money" ==
The opening theme song "Money, Money" was written by Wilde (under the pseudonym Jefferson Pascal) and sung by British musician and voice of the much-loved children's character Postman Pat, Ken Barrie.
