= The Big Combo =

1955 American film noir crime film directed by Joseph H. Lewis

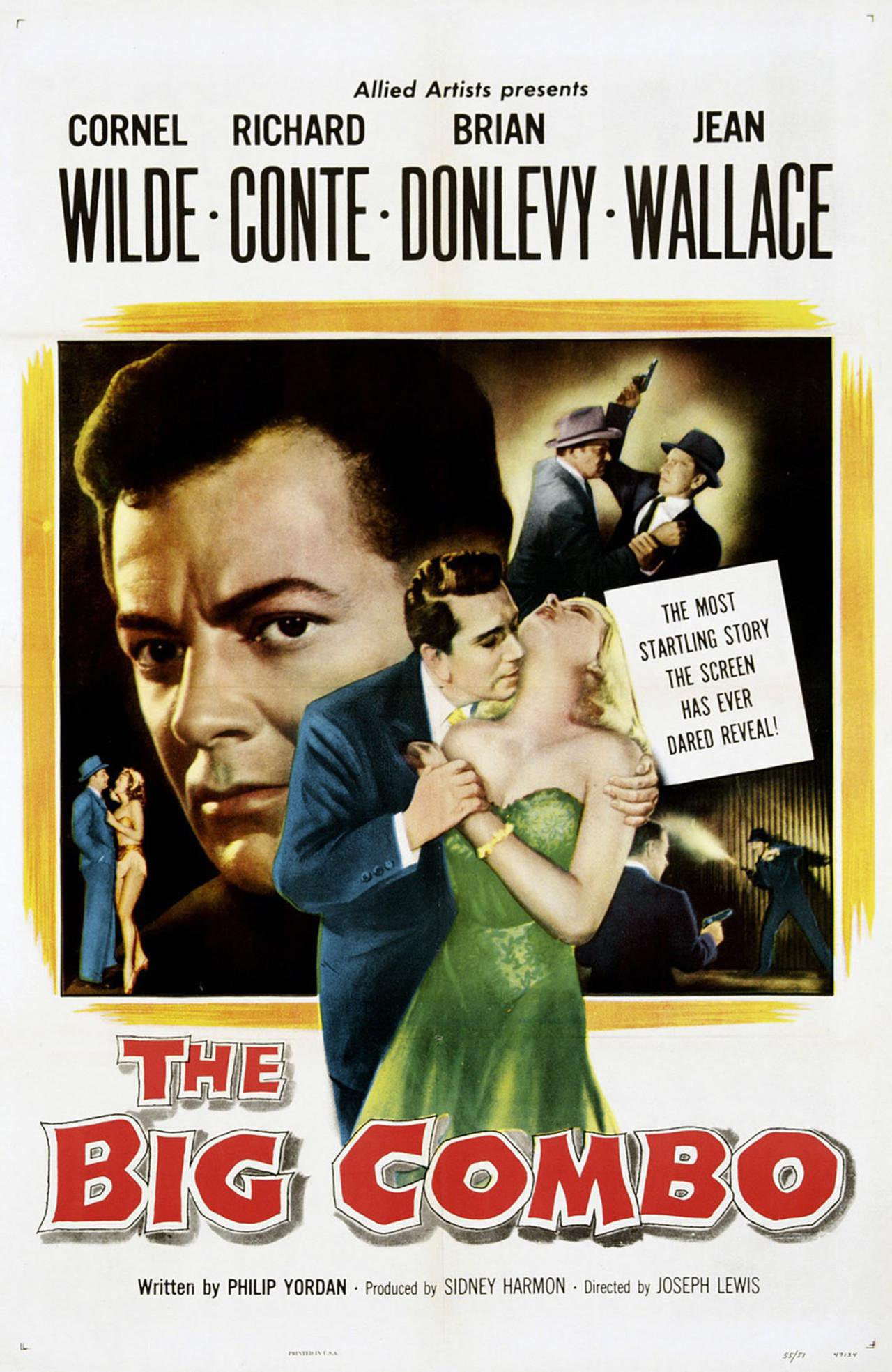
- Theatrical release poster
- Directed by: Joseph H. Lewis
- Screenplay by: Philip Yordan
- Produced by: Sidney Harmon
- Starring: Cornel Wilde; Richard Conte; Brian Donlevy; Jean Wallace
- Cinematography: John Alton
- Edited by: Robert S. Eisen
- Music by: David Raksin
- Color process: Black and white
- Production companies: Security Pictures; Theodora Productions
- Distributed by: Allied Artists Pictures
- Release date: February 13, 1955
- Running time: 88 minutes
- Country: United States
- Language: English
- Budget: $500,000

The Big Combo is a 1955 American film noir directed by Joseph H. Lewis, written by Philip Yordan and photographed by cinematographer John Alton, with music by David Raksin. The film stars Cornel Wilde, Richard Conte and Brian Donlevy, as well as Jean Wallace, who was Wilde's wife at the time. The supporting cast features Lee Van Cleef, Earl Holliman and the final screen appearance of actress Helen Walker. The Big Combo received positive reviews from critics.

While the film's title cards feature a copyright claim, a notice was not properly filed. In 2007 the United States Copyright Office ultimately rejected the notice, leaving the film in the public domain.

== Plot ==
Full film

Police Lieutenant Leonard Diamond is on a personal crusade to bring down the sadistic gangster Mr. Brown. (Note: Mr. Brown's given name is never stated in the film; he is only ever referred to by his surname.) He is also dangerously obsessed with Susan Lowell; she is Mr. Brown's girlfriend, and is despondent and suicidal because she cannot escape from him. Building his legal case against Mr. Brown, Diamond's main objective becomes investigating the identity of a woman, known only by the name "Alicia", who is connected to the gangster.

Mr. Brown becomes exasperated with Diamond's investigation and, with his second-in-command McClure and thugs Fante and Mingo, kidnaps and tortures the lieutenant, and pours a bottle of alcohol-based hair tonic down his throat before letting him go outside his police captain's apartment. Diamond eventually learns through one of Mr. Brown's past accomplices, Bettini, that Alicia was actually Mr. Brown's wife. Bettini suspects that Alicia was sent away to Sicily with former mob boss Grazzi, then murdered, tied to the boat's anchor, and permanently submerged. Diamond questions the operator of an antique store bankrolled by Mr. Brown named Dreyer who was also the skipper of the boat. Dreyer denies involvement and refuses to disclose anything to Diamond, but is nonetheless murdered by McClure shortly after leaving his shop.

Diamond tries to persuade Susan to leave Brown and admits he may be in love with her. He shows her a photo of Mr. Brown, Alicia and Grazzi together on the boat. Susan finally confronts Mr. Brown about his wife and is told she is still alive in Sicily, living with Grazzi.

Mr. Brown orders a hit on Diamond. However, when Fante and Mingo go to Diamond's apartment, they mistakenly shoot and kill Diamond's burlesque dancer girlfriend Rita instead. Diamond sees an up-to-date photo of Alicia but realizes it was not taken in Sicily due to the presence of snow on the ground. This leads Diamond to suspect Mr. Brown had killed his boss Grazzi, and not Alicia. Diamond tracks Alicia to a sanitarium, where she is staying under another name. He asks for her help.

Meanwhile, McClure wants to take over. He plots with Fante and Mingo to ambush Mr. Brown, but they betray him. With McClure dependent upon a hearing aid, Mr. Brown promises, as a small mercy, he will not have to hear the bullets when they murder him. Brown removes the hearing aid, at which point the soundtrack abruptly cuts to complete silence, and Fante and Mingo gun down McClure in a brief subjective silent shot.

At police headquarters, Susan and Alicia talk, and Diamond tells them about Rita being murdered. Alicia agrees to tell everything she knows, but Mr. Brown shows up and Alicia reacts with terror when she sees him. He has a writ of habeas corpus, effectively preventing Alicia from testifying against her husband. Mr. Brown takes food to Fante and Mingo, who are hiding out from the police, and also gives them a box, saying it contains a large sum of money for them to divide between them, but the box contains a bomb that apparently kills both of them.

Mr. Brown shoots Diamond's partner, Sam, and kidnaps Susan, planning to fly away to safety. However, Mingo survives the assassination attempt by Mr. Brown, and he confesses to Diamond that Mr. Brown was behind all the murders while sobbing over the body of his colleague Fante. Alicia is able to help Diamond figure out that Mr. Brown has taken Susan to a private airport where he intends to board his getaway plane.

However, Mr. Brown's plane does not show up, with the situation culminating in a foggy hangar shootout. Susan shines the fog lamp from Mr. Brown's car in his eyes, dazzling him and allowing Diamond to arrest him. The final scene shows the silhouetted figures of Diamond and Susan in the fog.

== Cast ==
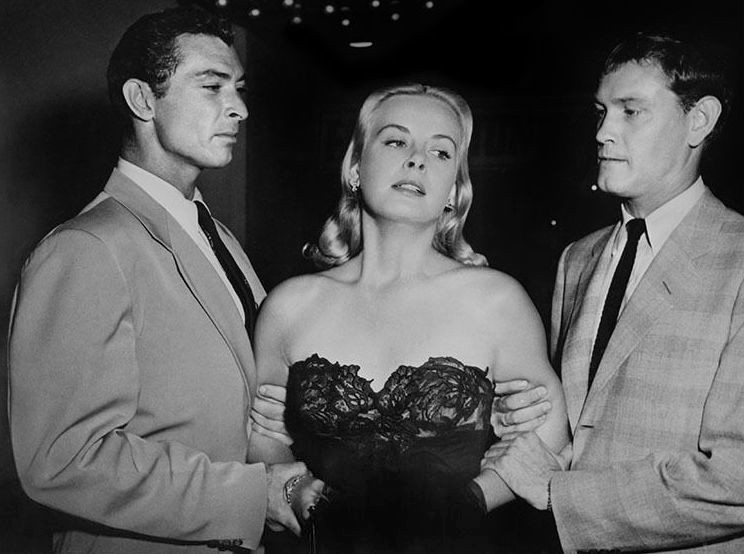
Lee Van Cleef, Jean Wallace and Earl Holliman

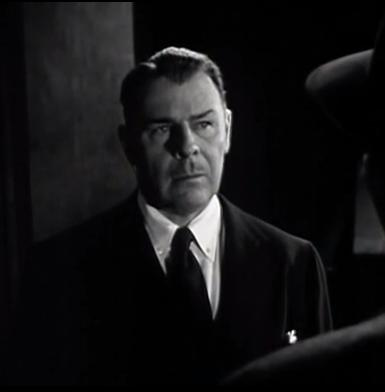
Brian Donlevy in the film

- Cornel Wilde as Police Lieutenant Leonard Diamond
- Richard Conte as Mr. Brown
- Brian Donlevy as Joe McClure
- Jean Wallace as Susan Lowell
- Robert Middleton as Police Capt. Peterson
- Lee Van Cleef as Fante
- Earl Holliman as Mingo
- Helen Walker as Alicia Brown
- Jay Adler as Sam Hill
- John Hoyt as Nils Dreyer
- Ted de Corsia as Ralph Bettini
- Helene Stanton as Rita
- Roy Gordon as Audubon
- Whit Bissell as Doctor (deleted scenes) (as Whit Bissel)
- Steve Mitchell as Bennie Smith – Boxer
- Baynes Barron as Young Detective
- James McCallion as Frank – Technician
- Tony Michaels as Photo Technician
- Brian O'Hara as Attorney Malloy
- Rita Gould as Nurse
- Bruce Sharpe Detective
- Michael Mark as Fred – Hotel Clerk
- Philip Van Zandt as Mr. Jones (deleted scenes)
- Donna Drew as Miss Hartleby

== Production ==
=== Development ===
The film was initially titled The Hoodlum based on a story by Philip Yordan. It was originally going to be directed by Hugo Fregonese for producer Milton Sperling. Sperling tried to cast Spencer Tracy for the lead. The script was in great demand with Yordan reportedly turning down offers of $75,000.

Eventually the film was a co-production between Theodora, the production company of Cornel Wilde and Jean Wallace, and Security, a company of Phil Yordan and Sidney Harmon. Wilde changed the title to The Big Combination and Wallace suggested it be shortened to The Big Combo.

Jack Palance was originally cast opposite Wilde. Finance originally came from United Artists but they dropped out and Allied Artists stepped in.

=== Shooting ===
Filming was brought forward to start on September 7, because of studio space availability. Palance dropped out of the film, claiming he wanted a week off after finishing Victor Saville's The Silver Chalice (1954) with Virginia Mayo and Paul Newman in his first film role. Palance was disappointed his wife was not cast in the second female lead. He was replaced by Richard Conte. Conte's casting meant the start date for another film, Cry Vengeance, had to be pushed back.

The film also marked the conclusion of Helen Walker's film career; she was consigned to a small but pivotal role in The Big Combo.

The film was shot in 26 days.

== Reception ==
Joseph Lewis said "we had a very good reception on that, extremely fine."

=== Critical response ===
The staff at Variety magazine liked the film's direction, music and photography, despite "a rambling, not-too-credible plot." They wrote, "Performances are in keeping with the bare-knuckle direction by Joseph Lewis and, on that score, are good. Low-key photography by John Alton, one of his best, and a jazz-derived score by David Raksin with solo piano by Jacob Gimpel are in keeping with the film's tough mood."

A pair of late-20th-century critics compared the quality of The Big Combo to Fritz Lang's The Big Heat as one of the great film noir detective classics in terms of style.

== Home media ==
The film was released on Blu-ray by Olive Films in 2013 with a restoration completed by UCLA Film & Television Archive and the Film Foundation. A new HD restoration was completed in 2018 by Arrow Films in the UK. In March 2026, Ignite Films will release The Big Combo on 4K UHD and Blu-ray with a new 70th Anniversary 4K restoration.

The Big Combo has also been shown on the Turner Classic Movies show 'Noir Alley' with Eddie Muller.

== Soundtrack ==
In a scene, pianist Jakob Gimpel (credited as Jacob Gimpel) appears playing Chopin's Scherzo No. 3, Op. 39. In a previous scene his performance of the same piece had been heard from a recording.

== Legacy ==
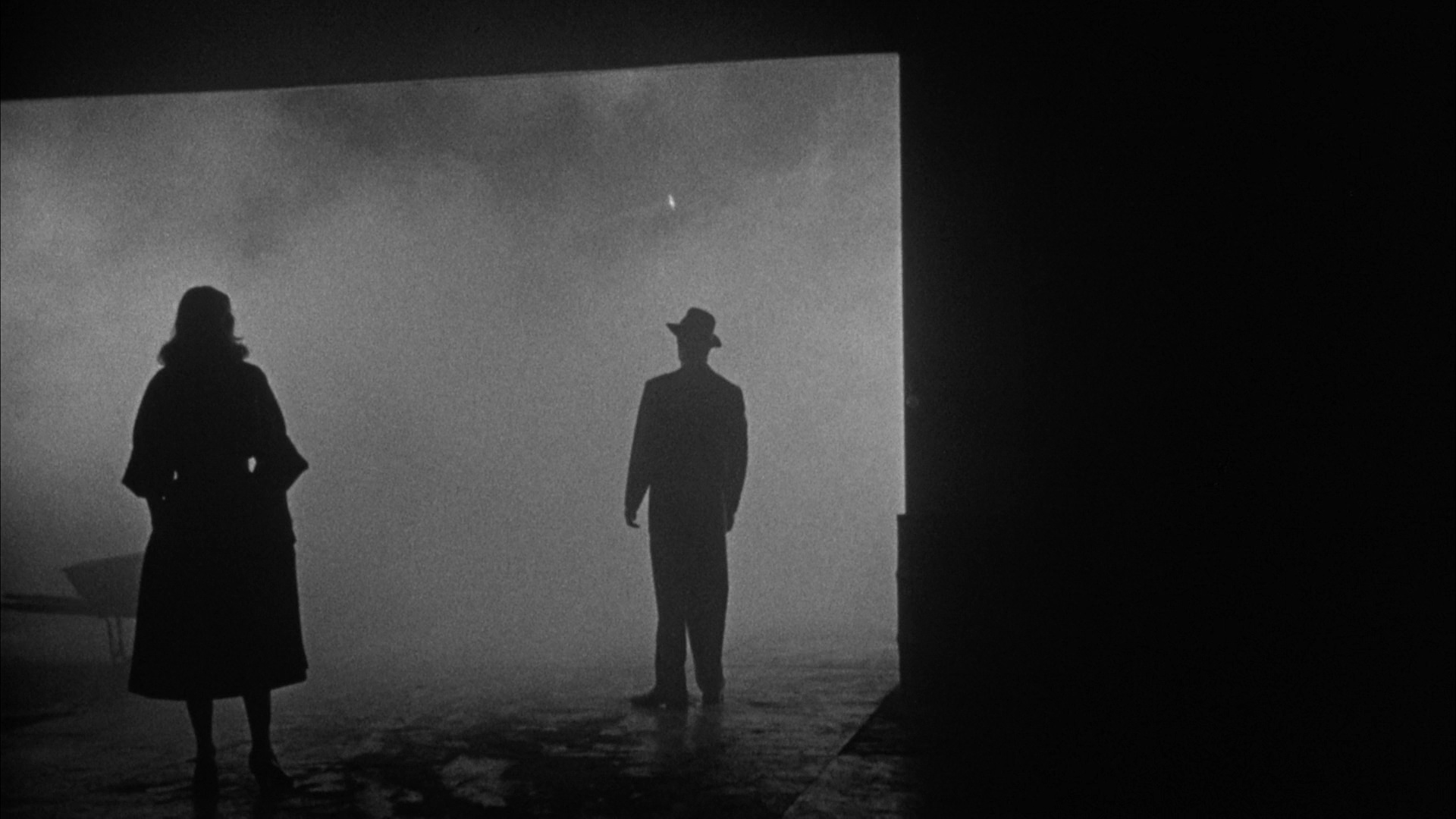
The closing scene to the film demonstrates John Alton's cinematographic style

The Big Combo has since received critical acclaim, with the airport scene being considered one of the most iconic images in film history. The film also served as inspiration for the torture scene in Quentin Tarantino's Reservoir Dogs (1992).

=== Retrospective assessments ===
In 2004 Chris Dashiell on the website CineScene found the dialogue "run of the mill" but praises the film's director, writing that "Lewis had a remarkable ability to infuse poetry into the most banal material, and The Big Combo is one of his best efforts... it's not as startlingly inventive as Lewis's best film, Gun Crazy (1949), but it's a quality B-film, satisfying and dark."

Film critic Ed Gonzalez lauded the film in his 2006 review, writing, "Shadows and lies are the stars of The Big Combo, a spellbinding black-and-white chiaroscuro with the segmented texture of a spider's web ... John Alton's lush camera work is so dominant here you wouldn't know Joseph H. Lewis was also behind the camera. The story doesn't have any of the he-she psychosexual politicking that juices the director's Gun Crazy, but that's no loss given this film's richer returns. The set-pieces are fierce, as is the Casablanca tweak of the last shot, and Wallace's performance—a sad spectacle of a hurting creature caught between light and dark, good and evil—is one of noir's great unheralded triumphs."

Eddie Muller of the Film Noir Foundation wrote: "Yordan's tale was the most stripped-down rendering of gangsterism yet. It benefits from the austere direction of Joseph H. Lewis, who plays it like Robert Bresson, if Bresson swung a shot-loaded sap. The poverty of the production is artfully masked by the photography of John Alton. The three had a good time pushing the limits of what was permissible on-screen."

The review aggregator Rotten Tomatoes reported that 93% of critics gave the film a positive review, based on 14 reviews, with a weighted average of 7.00/10.

== See also ==
- List of American films of 1955
- List of films in the public domain in the United States

== Bibliography ==
- Bogdanovich, Peter (1997). Who the Devil Made It. New York: Alfred A. Knopf.
