= Beach Red =

1967 film by Cornel Wilde

- Theatrical release poster
- Directed by: Cornel Wilde
- Screenplay by: Clint Johnston; Donald A. Peters; Cornel Wilde
- Based on: Beach Red (1945 novella) by Peter Bowman
- Produced by: Cornel Wilde
- Starring: Cornel Wilde; Rip Torn; Burr DeBenning; Patrick Wolfe
- Cinematography: Cecil Cooney
- Edited by: Frank P. Keller
- Music by: Antonino Buenaventura
- Production companies: Theodora Productions, Inc.
- Distributed by: United Artists
- Release date: August 3, 1967
- Running time: 105 minutes
- Country: United States
- Languages: English; Japanese

Beach Red is a 1967 American war film directed, co-written, produced by, and starring Cornel Wilde. An adaptation of the novella of the same title by Peter Bowman, the film depicts a landing by the United States Marine Corps on an unnamed Japanese-held Pacific island. The film and Bowman's novel were based on the author's own experiences in the U.S. Army Corps of Engineers in the Pacific Campaign. It co-stars Rip Torn, Burr DeBenning, Jean Wallace, and Jaime Sánchez.

The film was released by United Artists on August 3, 1967. At the 40th Academy Awards, the film was nominated for Best Film Editing (Frank P. Keller).

== Plot ==
The 30-minute opening sequence of the film depicts an opposed beach landing. In one scene during the landing, a Marine is shown with his arm blown off, similar to Thomas C. Lea III's 1944 painting The Price.

As Americans are shown consolidating their gains, flashbacks illustrate the lives of American and Japanese combatants. Shifting first-person voice-over in a stream-of-consciousness style is also used to portray numerous characters' thoughts.

The film contains large sections of voice-over narration, often juxtaposed with still photographs of wives, etc. (who are anachronistically dressed in 1967 attire). Many soldiers in the film shed tears, and the narrative displays an unusual amount of sympathy for the enemy.

In one scene, an injured Cliff is lying close to an injured Japanese soldier in a scene paralleling the one from All Quiet on the Western Front with Paul Bäumer and Gérard Duval. Just after the two soldiers bond, other Marines appear and kill the Japanese soldier, distressing Cliff.

== Cast ==
- Cornel Wilde as Captain MacDonald
- Rip Torn as Gunnery Sergeant Honeywell
- Burr DeBenning as Egan
- Patrick Wolfe as Cliff
- Jean Wallace as Julie
- Jaime Sánchez as Colombo
- Dale Ishimoto as Captain Tanaka
- Genki Koyama as Captain Sugiyama
- Gene Blakely as Goldberg
- Norman Pak as Nakano
- Dewey Stringer as Mouse
- Fred Galang as Lieutenant Domingo
- Hiroshi Kiyama as Michio
- Michael Parsons as Sergeant Lindstrom
- Linda Albertano as Carla
- Jan Garrison as Susie
- Michio Hazama as Captain Kondo
- Jun Bona as Hoashi
- Kiyoma Takezawa as Ichikawa

== Meaning of title ==
During the Allied amphibious operations in World War II, designated invasion beaches were given a codename by color, such as "Beach Red," "Beach White," "Beach Blue", etc. There was a "Beach Red" on virtually every assaulted island, in accordance with the standard beach designation hierarchy.

== Production ==
Beach Red was filmed on location in the Philippines using troops of the Philippine Armed Forces. The sequence of the Japanese dressed in Marine uniforms was inspired by Bowman's book, which mentions Japanese wearing American helmets to infiltrate American lines. There were no known incidents in the Pacific where large numbers of Japanese donned American uniforms and attempted to infiltrate a beachhead. The action, though, is similar in some ways to a large-scale Japanese counterattack and banzai charge conducted on July 7, 1944, on Saipan, which was defeated by U.S. Army troops with heavy losses.

When seeking assistance from the U.S. Marine Corps, Wilde was told that due to the commitments of the Vietnam War, all the Corps could provide the film was color stock footage taken during the Pacific War. The film provided had deteriorated, so Wilde had to spend a considerable part of the film's budget to restore the film to an acceptable quality in order to blend into the film. The Marine Corps was grateful that their historical film had been restored at no cost to them.

The film's title sequence incorporates various paintings that suddenly segue into the preparations for the landing. The 30-minute opening sequence of the film's graphic depiction of the violence and savagery of war was echoed years later in Steven Spielberg's Saving Private Ryan.

Like Wilde's previous production of The Naked Prey (1965), the film does not use subtitles for non-English dialogue, in this case Japanese.

== Soundtrack ==
The film's single musical theme is by Col. Antonino Buenaventura, a National Artist of the Philippines in Music. It appears in the title sequence, sung in a folk song manner by Jean Wallace – Wilde's wife – and appears in various other orchestrations throughout the film. Wallace also appears in flashback photos as Wilde's character's wife, Julie MacDonald.

== Reception ==
=== Critical response ===
Howard Thompson of The New York Times praised the film as "an admirable war movie that says a bit and suggests even more, thanks to Cornel Wilde." Variety wrote that "[i]n contrast to many professedly anti-war films, Beach Red is indisputably sincere in its war is hell message."

In a capsule review published many years after the film debuted, Time Out London wrote, "Wilde's neglected WWII movie is an allegory about the futility and the carnage of Vietnam. ... The movie is massively and harrowingly brutal, almost like a horror movie, with severed limbs washing up on the beach. Although Wilde deals exclusively in pacifist clichés, the film has a genuine primitive power; in fact, it's the equal of anything made by Fuller."

=== Awards and nominations ===
Award	Year	Category	Nominee	Result
Academy Award	1968	Best Film Editing	Frank P. Keller	Nominated
American Cinema Editors Award	1968	Best Edited Feature Film – Dramatic	Frank P. Keller	Nominated

== See also ==
- List of American films of 1967
