= Bob Drake (racing driver) =

American racing driver (1919–1990)

- Born: December 14, 1919; San Francisco, California, U.S.
- Died: April 18, 1990 (aged 70); Woodland Hills, California, U.S.

Formula One World Championship career
- Nationality: (United States) American
- Active years: 1960
- Team: privateer Maserati
- Entries: 1
- Championships: 0
- Wins: 0
- Podiums: 0
- Career points: 0
- Pole positions: 0
- Fastest laps: 0
- First entry: 1960 United States Grand Prix

Eldon Robert Drake (December 14, 1919 – April 18, 1990) was an American racecar driver. He participated in one Formula One Grand Prix, on November 20, 1960. He scored no championship points. Drake was the last driver to race the famous Maserati 250F in a Formula One World Championship Grand Prix, the 1960 United States Grand Prix. The 250F was a 2.5 litre front-engined Grand Prix car that was considered obsolete in 1961 due to new engine rules.

Aside from being a race car driver, he was a naval diver, restaurateur, and stunt performer.

== Complete Formula One World Championship results ==
(key)

Year	Entrant	Chassis	Engine	1	2	3	4	5	6	7	8	9	10	WDC	Points
1960	Joe Lubin	Maserati 250F	Maserati Straight-6	ARG	MON	500	NED	BEL	FRA	GBR	POR	ITA	USA; 13	NC	0
