= As You Are =

As You Are may refer to:

== Film and television ==
- As You Are (television film) Australian television play which aired in 1958 on ABC
- As You Are (film), a 2016 American film

== Literature ==
- As You Are (play), a 1939 play by Hugh Mills and Wells Root

== Music ==
=== Albums ===
- As You Are (album) by Jason Lancaster, 2014

=== Songs ===
- "As You Are" (Dean Martin song), 1951
- "As You Are", by The Weeknd from Beauty Behind the Madness, 2015
- "As You Are", by Travis from The Man Who, 1999
- "As You Are", by Boney James from Ride, 2001
- "As You Are", by Kimbra from The Golden Echo, 2014
- "As You Are", by Charlie Puth from Nine Track Mind, 2016
- "As You Are" (Rag'n'Bone Man song), 2017

== See also ==
- Alive as You Are, 2010 album by Darker My Love
- Be as You Are (disambiguation)
  - "Be as You Are (Songs from an Old Blue Chair)", song by Kenny Chesney
  - "Be as You Are" (Mike Posner song), song by Mike Posner from his 2016 album At Night, Alone
- Looking As You Are, 2005 album by Embrace
- Stay as You Are, a 1978 Italian–Spanish erotic drama film
