= Man of Conquest =

1939 film

- Film poster
- Directed by: George Nicholls Jr.
- Written by: Harold Shumate; Wells Root; Jan Isbell Fortune; Edward E. Paramore Jr.
- Produced by: Sol C. Siegel
- Starring: Richard Dix
- Cinematography: Joseph H. August
- Edited by: Edward Mann
- Music by: Victor Young
- Production company: Republic Pictures
- Distributed by: Republic Pictures
- Release date: May 15, 1939
- Running time: 99 minutes
- Country: United States
- Language: English
- Budget: $750,000

Man of Conquest is a 1939 American Western film directed by George Nicholls Jr. and starring Richard Dix, Gail Patrick, and Joan Fontaine. The film was nominated for three Academy Awards for Best Score, Best Sound (Charles L. Lootens), and Best Art Direction (John Victor Mackay).

The film marked the first serious attempt by Republic Pictures to break out from its traditional production of B movies and produce a work of greater cost and prestige. The film is a biopic of the politician Sam Houston, focusing on his relationship with Andrew Jackson and his role during the Texas Revolution. It was inspired by Marquis James's 1929 Pulitzer Prize-winning biography of Houston.

== Plot ==
Sam Houston fights beside his friend Andrew Jackson and is wounded. Not long thereafter, Jackson is elected President of the United States and appoints Houston as governor of Tennessee.

Houston is married to Eliza Allen, but his lifestyle as a politician does not appeal to her. Their divorce is somewhat scandalous for the time, and Houston decides to accept Jackson's suggestion that he become ambassador to the Cherokee tribe instead.

On a trip to Washington, DC, to put forth his argument how the Indians are being mistreated in their own land, Houston falls in love with Margaret Lea at a presidential ball. She returns with him to Texas, where the next mission for Houston is to free the territory from the rule of Mexico, either by diplomacy or on the battlefield.

Stephen F. Austin disagrees with Houston's methods, preferring peaceful negotiations, but when the army of Santa Ana heads toward The Alamo in tremendous numbers, Houston knows no peaceful settlement is possible. He arrives too late to prevent the carnage there, but then leads the Texans in their fight for freedom and statehood.

== Cast ==
- Richard Dix as Sam Houston
- Gail Patrick as Margaret Lea
- Edward Ellis as Andrew Jackson
- Joan Fontaine as Eliza Allen
- Victor Jory as William B. Travis
- Robert Barrat as David Crockett
- George 'Gabby' Hayes as Lannie Upchurch
- Ralph Morgan as Stephen F. Austin
- Robert Armstrong as Jim Bowie
- C. Henry Gordon as Santa Ana
- Janet Beecher as Mrs. Sarah Lea
- Pedro de Cordoba as Oolooteka
- Max Terhune as Deaf Smith
- Kathleen Lockhart as Mrs. Allen
- Russell Hicks as Mr. Allen
- Leon Ames as John Hoskins
- Olaf Hytten as Footman (uncredited)
- Ethan Laidlaw as Fighter (uncredited)
- Francis Sayles as Martin Van Buren (uncredited)
- Charles Stevens as Zavola (uncredited)

== Other use ==
Republic Pictures contributed footage from scenes dealing with Sam Houston and the Alamo in the not-yet-completed film for inclusion in the 1939 documentary Land of Liberty.

== Bibliography ==
- Hurst, Richard M. Republic Studios: Between Poverty Row and the Majors. Scarecrow Press, 2007.
