= Patty Petersen =

American actress (born 1954)

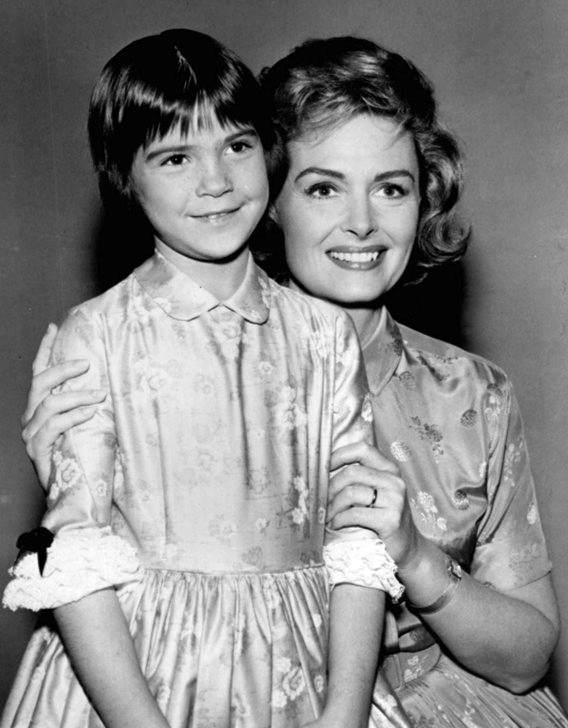
Petersen and Donna Reed in 1963

Patti Petersen Mirkovich (born December 2, 1954) is a retired American child actress.

Petersen's brother costarred on ABC's The Donna Reed Show. She was written into the cast as Trisha, an adopted child after Shelley Fabares left the series. She stayed with the show until it ended in 1966.

After many commercials and industrial films, she semi-retired to marry and rear a family of her own. She was a country songwriter/singer for a while. Now known as Patti Petersen Mirkovich, she is the founder of an Internet company for novice authors. She has two children.

She also serves on the board of the Donna Reed Foundation for the Performing Arts.

== Filmography ==
- The Donna Reed Show (1963–66) (Trisha Stone) (99 episodes)
- Television: The First Fifty Years (1999) (Trisha Stone, archive footage)
- Real People with Stephanie Allensworth (2018) (Self) (Interview)
