= Mokey =

1942 film by Wells Root

- Directed by: Wells Root
- Screenplay by: Wells Root; and Jan Fortune
- Based on: stories by Jennie Harris Oliver
- Produced by: J. Walter Ruben
- Starring: Dan Dailey, Jr.; Donna Reed; Bobby Blake
- Cinematography: Charles Rosher, a.s.c.
- Edited by: Frank Sullivan
- Music by: Lennie Hayton
- Distributed by: Metro-Goldwyn-Mayer
- Release date: April 1942
- Running time: 88 minutes
- Country: United States
- Language: English
- Budget: $353,000
- Box office: $277,000

Mokey is a 1942 American comedy-drama film released by MGM, directed by Wells Root and starring Dan Dailey, Jr., Donna Reed and Bobby Blake.

== Plot ==
Eight-year-old Mokey's widowed father Herbert remarries and the young stepmother Anthea has difficulty interacting with the little boy who, even though his intentions are good, continues to fall into trouble.

== Cast ==
- Dan Dailey, Jr. as Herbert Delano
- Donna Reed as Anthea Delano
- Bobby Blake as Mokey Delano
- Cordell Hickman as Booker T. Cumby
- William "Buckwheat" Thomas as Brother Cumby
- Etta McDaniel as Cindy Molishus
- Marcella Moreland as Begonia Cumby
- George Lloyd as Pat Esel
- Matt Moore as Mr. Pennington
- Cleo Desmond as Aunt Deedy
- Cliff Clark as Mr. Graham
- Mary Field as Mrs. Graham
- Bobby Stebbins as Brickley Autry
- Sam McDaniel as Uncle Ben

== Reception ==
The film made $179,000 in the US and Canada and $98,000 elsewhere during its initial theatrical run, causing MGM a loss of $205,000.
