= The Long Haul (1957 film) =

British drama by Ken Hughes

- Theatrical release poster
- Directed by: Ken Hughes
- Written by: Ken Hughes
- Based on: novel The Long Haul by Mervyn Mills
- Produced by: Maxwell Setton
- Starring: Victor Mature; Diana Dors; Patrick Allen; Gene Anderson
- Cinematography: Basil Emmott
- Edited by: Raymond Poulton
- Music by: Trevor Duncan
- Production company: Marksman Films
- Distributed by: Columbia Pictures
- Release dates: 27 August 1957 (UK); December 1957 (US)
- Running time: 88 mins.
- Country: United Kingdom
- Language: English
- Budget: over $1 million

The Long Haul is a 1957 British drama film directed and written by Ken Hughes and starring Victor Mature, Diana Dors and Patrick Allen. It is based on the novel The Long Haul by Mervyn Mills.

== Plot ==
Harry Miller, a U.S. Army NCO, leaves Allied-occupied Germany after discharge and is persuaded by his English wife Connie to settle in Liverpool. Looking for work, he becomes a lorry driver. He soon comes into contact with criminals involved in theft from long-hauling lorries and draws close to Lynn, the beautiful blonde girlfriend of a crime figure. Lynn falls in love with Harry. Miller, initially determined to remain honest, slips into crime.

== Cast ==
- Victor Mature as Harry Miller
- Diana Dors as Lynn
- Patrick Allen as Joe Easy
- Gene Anderson as Connie Miller
- Peter Reynolds as Frank
- Liam Redmond as Casey
- John Welsh as doctor
- Meier Tzelniker as Nat Fine
- Michael Wade as Butch Miller
- Dervis Ward as Mutt
- Murray Kash as Jeff
- Jameson Clark as MacNaughton
- John Harvey as Superintendent Macrea
- Roland Brand as Army sergeant
- Stanley Rose as foreman
- Barry Raymond as depot manager
- Norman Rossington as Liverpool driver
- Arthur Mullard as minor role
- Alfred Burke as drunk in club (uncredited)
- Sam Kydd as taxi driver
- Madge Brindley as café proprietress

== Original novel ==
The film was based on the 1956 novel by Mervyn Mills, his first novel. According to his obituary in The Independent newspaper, the novel "stemmed from his journeys through early post-war Britain on a moped, before the advent of the motorways, when he absorbed, on the Great North Road, something of the lives of the long-distance lorry drivers, their roadside cafes and the people, often women, who frequented them. The book was turned down by 12 publishers, then accepted by the 13th, and even then Mills had to fight for his artistic integrity with the director and general editor Lovat Dickson to retain the more colourful passages. After so many rejections, this took courage."

The Irish Times called it "an exciting and unusually vivid book".

== Development ==
Film rights were bought by Todon Productions, the film company of Tony Owen and Donna Reed, run by Maxwell Setton. Ken Hughes, who had made films for them before, signed to write and direct.

In July 1956 Diana Dors agreed to play the female lead. Like many Todon films, it was distributed through Columbia. The production was credited to Seton's company, Marksman Films. Columbia were financing a number of films in Britain at the time.

Robert Mitchum originally was announced as the male star. In January 1957 Victor Mature signed. Mature had just made three films in England for Warwick Productions, which also distributed through Columbia: Zarak, Safari and Interpol. Mature had driven trucks for his father's business when younger.

Setton tried to get Raymond Burr to support Mature and Dors but was unable to secure him. A lead role was played by newcomer Patrick Allen whom Setton signed to a three-picture contract over three years.

== Production ==
Filming started 18 February and took place at British Lion studios in Shepperton. There was location filming in the Scottish Highlands.

== Reception ==
=== Box office ===
In September 1957 Kinematograph Weekly reported the film "has found it uphill work at the Odeon, Marble Arch. It is however, designed for the crowd rather than the discerning and its time will come when it goes on tour."

== Critical reception ==
Monthly Film Bulletin said "This dreary thriller is hardly recognisable as the work (screenplay and direction) of the once promising Ken Hughes. On the contrary, its script and zestless handling exploit almost every known melodramatic cliché in the pursuit of squalor and violence, while its depiction of road haulage is most unconvincing. Victor Mature and Diana Dors handle synthetic roles with mournful expressions and apparent indifference; of the variable supporting cast only Patrick Allen stands out as a villain of real power and substance. The authentic Northern backgrounds, well photographed by Basil Emmot, are fully utilised in a single gripping sequence in which a ten-ton truck is driven over mountains – an oasis in the desert of tedium."

Leonard Maltin dismissed the film as "Minor fare", whereas DVD Talk commended a "Completely satisfying British B-noir. Sure the story is familiar, but it's handled with cold, professional skill. The performers are perfectly cast here. I'm highly recommending The Long Haul."

Filmink called it "a decent little movie, and Dors was as beautiful and warm as ever, reminding everyone what she was capable of."

In British Sound Films: The Studio Years 1928–1959 David Quinlan rated the film as "average", writing: "Unsavoury thriller, well photographed."

== Alternative title ==
In Spain, the original poster gave it the title 'El Precio de un Hombre', 'The Price of a Man'.

== See also ==
- List of American films of 1957
- Hell Drivers (1957)
