= As You Are (TV film) =

- Written by: Hugh Mills; Wells Root
- Starring: Paul Bacon
- Country of origin: Australia
- Original language: English

Production
- Running time: 90 mins
- Production company: ABC

Original release
- Release: 4 June 1958 (Melbourne, live)
- Release: 30 July 1958 (Sydney)

As You Are is an Australian television play which aired in 1958 on ABC. The play was telecast live in Melbourne and kinescoped for showing in Sydney (these were the only two Australian cities with TV at the time). It is adapted from the 1939 West End play As You Are by Hugh Mills and Wells Root.

== Plot ==
An underwear salesman from northern England becomes involved with a confidence man from the Continent.

== Cast ==
- Paul Bacon
- Georgina Batterham
- Max Bruch
- Agnes Dobson
- Laurie Lange
- George Ogilvie
- Fred Parslow

== Production ==
The play starred Paul Bacon an English actor living in Australia.

== See also ==
- List of live television plays broadcast on Australian Broadcasting Corporation (1950s)
