= The Impostor (1944 American film) =

1944 film by Julien Duvivier

- Theatrical release poster
- Directed by: Julien Duvivier
- Written by: Julien Duvivier; Stephen Longstreet; Marc Connelly; Lynn Starling
- Produced by: Julien Duvivier
- Starring: Jean Gabin; Richard Whorf; Ellen Drew
- Cinematography: Paul Ivano
- Edited by: Paul Landres
- Music by: Dimitri Tiomkin
- Production company: Universal Pictures
- Distributed by: Universal Pictures
- Release date: February 10, 1944
- Running time: 95 minutes
- Country: United States
- Language: English

The Impostor (aka Strange Confession) is a 1944 American drama war film directed by Julien Duvivier and starring Jean Gabin, Richard Whorf and Ellen Drew. It was produced and distributed by Universal Pictures. The film's sets were designed by the art directors Eugène Lourié and John B. Goodman. It was one of two films Gabin made in Hollywood where he had travelled following the Fall of France in 1940.

== Plot ==
Clement (Gabin), a condemned murderer literally minutes away from the guillotine, is "liberated" when the Nazis bomb hit the French jail that holds him. During his escape he steals the uniform and identification papers of a dead French soldier. He then hides from the law by joining the Free French Forces in French Equatorial Africa. Clement's new identity and purpose in life reform him. In the end he sacrifices himself in the service of his country.

== Cast ==
- Jean Gabin as Clement / Maurice LeFarge
- Richard Whorf as Lt. Vareene
- Allyn Joslyn as Bouteau
- Ellen Drew as Yvonne
- Peter Van Eyck as Hafner
- Ralph Morgan as Col. De Bolvin
- Eddie Quillan as Cochery
- John Qualen as Monge
- Dennis Moore as Maurice LaFarge
- Milburn Stone as Clauzel
- John Philliber as Mortemart
- Charles McGraw as Menessier
- Otho Gaines as Matowa
- John Forrest as Free French corporal
- Fritz Leiber as Priest
- Ian Wolfe as Sgt. Clerk
- William B. Davidson as Adjutant
- Frank Wilcox as Prosecutor
- Warren Ashe as Officer
- Peter Cookson as Soldier
- Leigh Whipper as Toba
- Ernest Whitman as Ekoua
- Grandon Rhodes as Captain
- George Irving as Prosecutor
