= The Donna Reed Show =

American sitcom (1958–1966)

- First season title screen
- Genre: Sitcom
- Starring: Donna Reed; Carl Betz; Shelley Fabares; Paul Petersen; Patty Petersen
- Theme music composer: John Seely
- Opening theme: "Happy Days"
- Composers: Irving Friedman; William Loose; Stu Phillips; Hans J. Salter
- Country of origin: United States
- Original language: English
- No. of seasons: 8
- No. of episodes: 275 (list of episodes)

Production
- Producers: Tony Owen; William S. Roberts
- Cinematography: Gert Andersen
- Editors: Richard Fantl; Robert B. Hoover
- Camera setup: Single-camera
- Running time: 22–24 minutes
- Production companies: Todon of California (1958–1963); Briskin Productions (1958–1959); Screen Gems

Original release
- Network: ABC
- Release: September 24, 1958 – March 19, 1966

The Donna Reed Show is an American sitcom starring Donna Reed as the middle-class housewife Donna Stone. Carl Betz co-starred as her husband, pediatrician Dr. Alex Stone, with Shelley Fabares and Paul Petersen as their teenage children, Mary and Jeff. The show originally aired on ABC from September 24, 1958, to March 19, 1966.

== Background ==
The series was sponsored by Campbell Soup Company, with Johnson & Johnson as the principal alternate sponsor (succeeded in the fall of 1963 by the Singer Company).

The Donna Reed Show was the first television family sitcom to place the mother at the center of the story. Reed's character, Donna Stone, is a loving mother and wife, but also a strong woman, an active participant in her community, a woman with feelings and a sense of humor. According to many of Reed's friends and family, she closely resembled the character she portrayed on screen, suggesting that Donna Stone was modeled directly on Reed herself.

It was made by Reed's company with her husband Tony Owen, Todon. Todon had produced several films in Britain.

In a 2008 interview, Paul Petersen (who played Jeff Stone) stated:

[The Donna Reed Show] depicts a better time and place. It has a sort of level of intelligence and professionalism that is sadly lacking in current entertainment products. The messages it sent out were positive and uplifting. The folks you saw were likable, the family was fun, the situations were familiar to people. It provided 22-and-a-half-minutes of moral instructions and advice on how to deal with the little dilemmas of life. Jeff and Mary and their friends had all the same problems that real kids in high school did.

Petersen continued:

That's what the show was really about, the importance of family. That's where life's lessons are transmitted, generation to generation. There's a certain way in which these are transmitted, with love and affection.

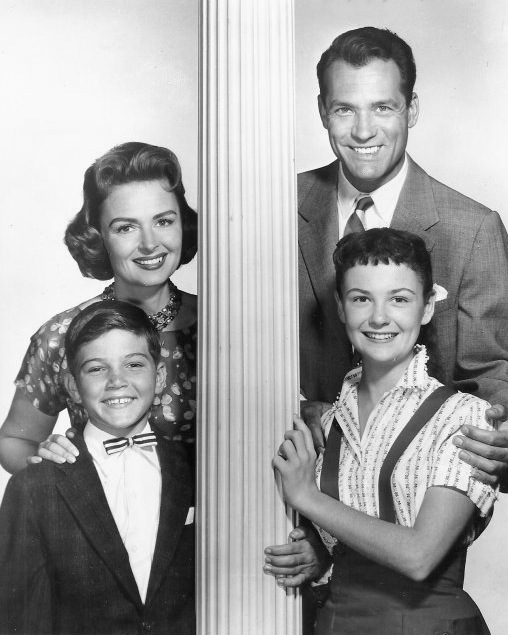
From the 1958 first season (L-R): Donna Reed as Donna Stone, Carl Betz as Dr. Alex Stone, Paul Petersen as Jeff Stone, and Shelley Fabares as Mary Stone

== Cast changes ==
In season 5 (1963), Mary departed for college, reducing Fabares' appearances, something which continued yearly as Mary became a minor character. Fabares left the full-time cast to pursue film opportunities. She eventually returned for seven guest appearances (Season 6 episodes 8, 11, 14; Season 7 episodes 5, 15, 30; Season 8 episode 13). Meanwhile, Paul Petersen's real-life sister Patty Petersen joined the show as Trisha, a runaway orphan eventually adopted by the Stones. The program achieved its highest Nielsen ratings in Season 6, reaching #16 after Fabares' departure. A possible reason for higher ratings was the addition of new characters, Ann McCrea and disc jockey-turned actor Bob Crane as the Stones' neighbors, Midge and Dave Kelsey. This not only provided both Donna and Alex with best friends, but co-conspirators, as well. So popular were their roles that by the fall of 1964, both McCrea and Crane began receiving billing in the opening credits of the program. Crane left the series in 1965 to star in the CBS sitcom Hogan's Heroes. As a result, he was written out of the show, although his character continued to be referred to and McCrea's character remained with the program. Also, towards the end of the series, Darryl Richard was regularly featured as Jeff Stone's best friend, Morton "Smitty" Smith. He first appeared in 1962 and "Smitty" became a major character after Season 6. Janet Landgard was a series regular from 1963 to 1965 as Karen Holmby.

== Characters and cast ==
=== Main ===
- Donna Stone (Donna Reed) the matriarch of the Stones.
- Alex Stone (Carl Betz) the husband of Donna.
- Mary Stone (Shelley Fabares) the biological daughter of Donna and Alex. (Main S1-5, Guest S6-8)
- Jeff Stone (Paul Petersen) the biological son of Donna and Alex.
- Trisha Stone (Patty Petersen) the adopted daughter of Donna and Alex. (Main S6-8)

=== Secondary ===
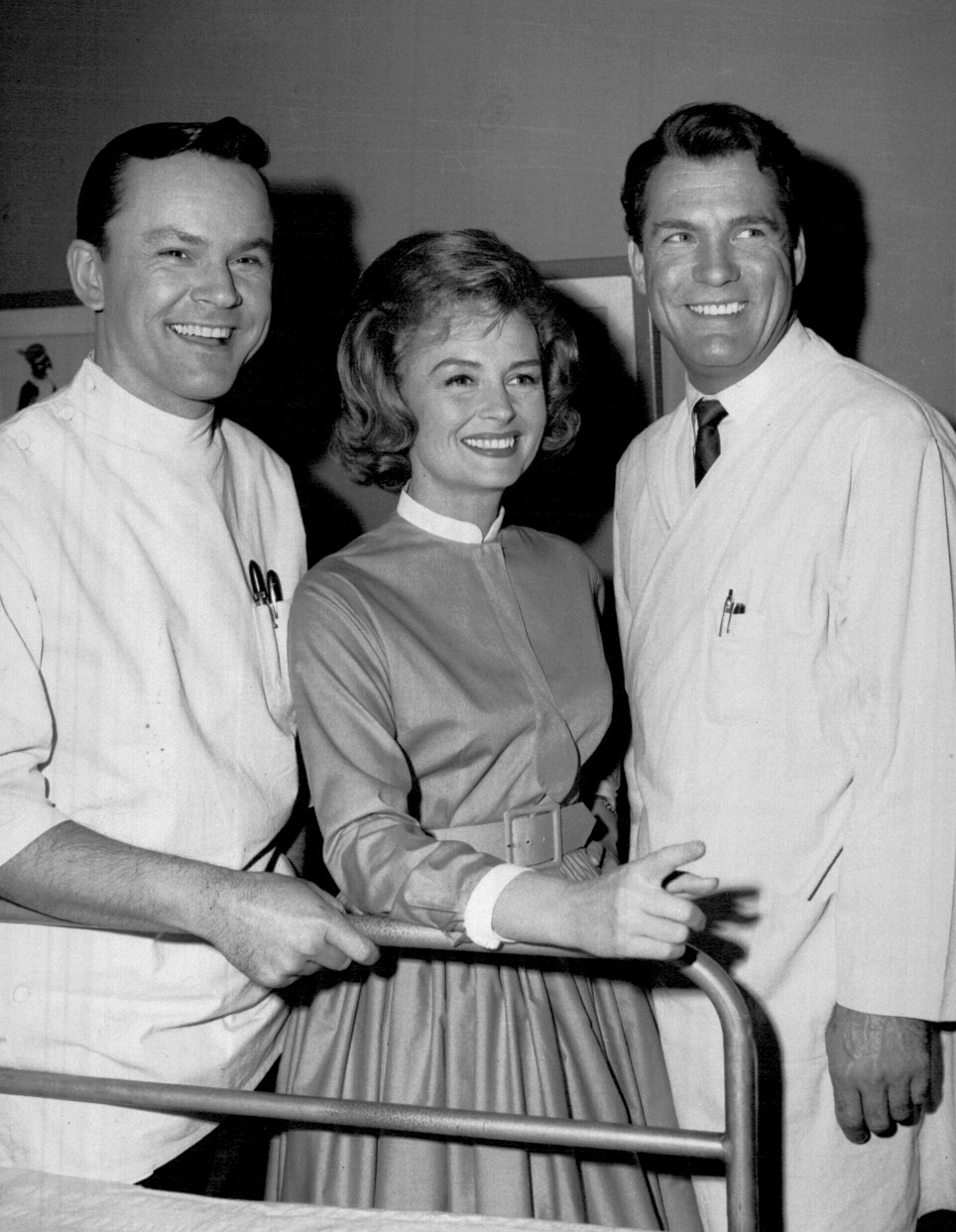
Bob Crane as Dr. Dave Kelsey with Donna and Alex Stone in 1963

- Dr. Dave Kelsey (Bob Crane) and his wife Midge (Ann McCrea) are friends of the Stones. Dave, Alex's colleague, appeared for the first time on March 14, 1963, in the episode "The Two Doctor Stones". Dave continued on the series until 1965; Midge appeared from 1963 to 1966. Crane's character was no longer seen on the show after the end of season 7, when he was cast in the CBS series, Hogan's Heroes. However, McCrea as "Midge" remained with the show until its conclusion, and the character of Dave was still often referenced as being at work, or running errands, or out of town visiting a relative, etc.
- David Barker (Charles Herbert) – a young military-school student who the Stones look after in several episodes in seasons 1 and 2. David is very disobedient and troubled in the beginning but the Stone family grows to reform and love him.
- Uncle Bo (Jack Kelk)
- Morton "Smitty" Smith (Darryl Richard)
- Zachary Blake (Stephen Pearson)
- Herbie Bailey (Tommy Ivo)
- Scotty (Jimmy Hawkins). Hawkins' character returned to the show in season 3 as 'Scotty', one of Mary's dates (for seasons 3–4) then as 'Jerry' for seasons 7 and 8 (his last appearance was in December 1965).
- Roger (Jan Stine)
- Angie (Candy Moore) is Jeff's girlfriend in several fourth season episodes. Moore returned to the program during season 8 as Jeff's 'new' girlfriend Bernice/Bebe, in episodes 3, 12, 16, and 19. Moore had just finished 3 seasons playing Lucille Ball's teenage daughter Chris on The Lucy Show. Moore was written out after season 3 (1965). Moore had acted on the program from 1962 to 1965. 'The Lucy Show' was her last acting assignment as a major character on a regular network program.
- Babs (Melinda Plowman) is Mary's first-season best friend.
- Mr. and Mrs. Wilgus (Howard McNear and Kathleen Freeman)
- Lydia Langley (Mary Shipp)

=== Guest stars ===
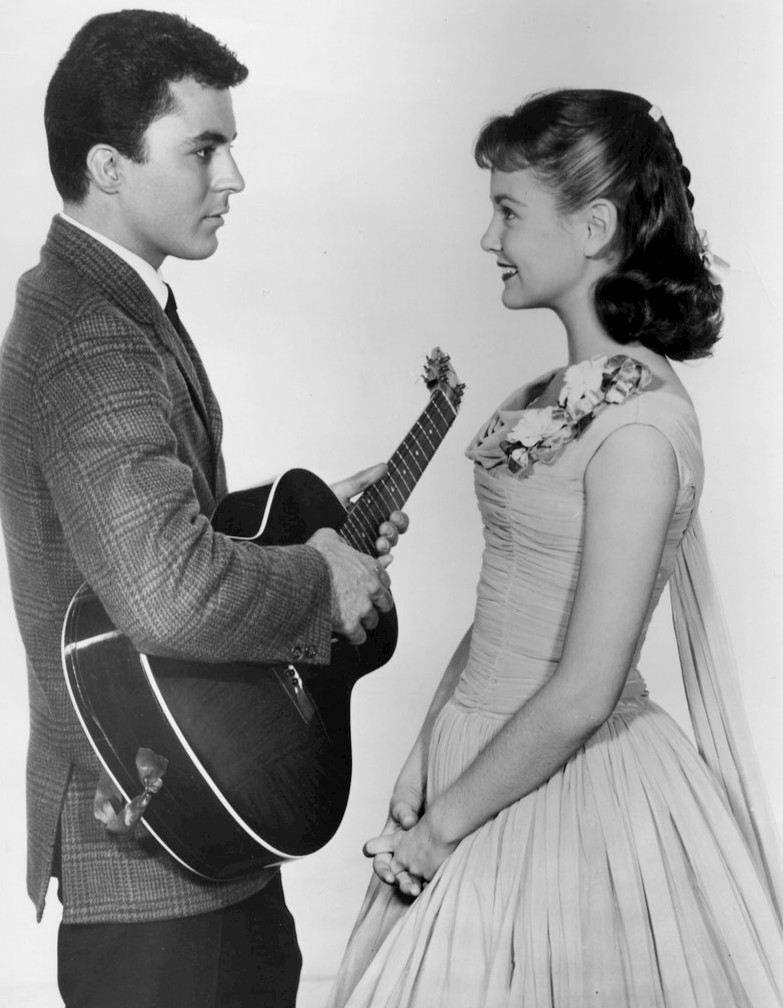
James Darren and Shelley Fabares

The Donna Reed Show featured several celebrity guest stars appearing as themselves during its eight-year run. Baseball player Don Drysdale appeared in four episodes while Willie Mays appeared in three episodes and Leo Durocher once. Musician Harry James and singers Tony Martin and Lesley Gore appeared as themselves. Gore was featured in the series' finale, "By-Line—Jeff Stone", on March 19, 1966. Lassie and film director George Sidney appear as themselves in the 1961 episode "The Stones Go To Hollywood". The episode plugged Sidney's then current feature film, Pepe, in which Reed made a cameo appearance. Teen heartthrob James Darren guest starred as a pop singer with the measles. Iconic silent comedian Buster Keaton appeared in "A Very Merry Christmas." as a hospital janitor December 24, 1958.

Child actor Charles Herbert also had a recurring guest role in four episodes as David Barker, a runaway child whom the Stones assist. In the 1960 crossover episode "Donna Decorates", Jay North appeared with his Dennis the Menace co-star, Joseph Kearns as Mr. George Wilson. Esther Williams guest starred as Molly, a fashion designer and friend of Donna's who is herself about to marry a doctor in "The Career Woman" (1960). In real life, Williams and Reed had been close friends since the early 1940s, when they were rising MGM contract stars.

Several actors guest starred numerous times in different roles including Richard Deacon, Gale Gordon, Harvey Korman, Miyoshi Umeki, Doodles Weaver, and Dick Wilson.

As Fabares co-starred in the Mickey Mouse Club serial Annette before the Donna Reed Show, four other Annette co-stars (Deacon, Cheryl Holdridge, Doreen Tracey & Mary Wickes) would also make respective guest appearances on this show. Paul Petersen was also on the Mickey Mouse Club.

Other notable guest stars include:

- Lee Aaker
- Jack Albertson
- John Astin
- Binnie Barnes
- Raymond Bailey
- Bobby Buntrock
- Bobby Burgess
- Harry Cheshire
- Dabney Coleman
- Hans Conried
- Richard Conte
- Ellen Corby
- Johnny Crawford
- Esther Dale
- Kim Darby
- Margaret Dumont
- Stuart Erwin
- Tiger Fafara
- Jamie Farr
- Florida Friebus
- Harold Gould
- George Hamilton
- Arte Johnson
- DeForest Kelley
- Ted Knight
- Sheila Kuehl
- Charles Lane
- Cloris Leachman
- Alice Pearce
- Gigi Perreau
- Marion Ross
- William Schallert
- Hal Smith
- James Stacy
- Tisha Sterling
- Olive Sturgess
- Stephen Talbot
- Marlo Thomas
- Mary Treen
- Jesse White
- Rhys Williams
- William Windom
- Estelle Winwood
- Will Wright

== Episodes ==
Season	Episodes	Originally released	
Season	Episodes	First released	Last released
1	37	September 24, 1958	June 3, 1959
2	38	September 24, 1959	June 16, 1960
3	38	September 15, 1960	June 8, 1961
4	39	September 14, 1961	June 14, 1962
5	34	September 20, 1962	May 9, 1963
6	32	September 19, 1963	April 23, 1964
7	30	September 17, 1964	April 8, 1965
8	27	September 16, 1965	March 19, 1966

== Home media ==
For a limited time in 2004, General Mills offered a DVD of two episodes inside boxes of "Total" cereal and Oatmeal Crisp. Virgil Films and Entertainment (under license from the estates of Donna Reed and Tony Owen) released the first three seasons of the show on DVD in Region 1. Virgil also released a four-episode "best of" DVD on April 13, 2010.

On December 17, 2010, it was announced that MPI Home Video had acquired the rights to release seasons 4 and 5 of The Donna Reed Show. Season 4 was subsequently released on December 20, 2011, and Season 5 was released on December 4, 2012.

On September 30, 2014, MPI Home Video re-released the first season on DVD. Season 2 was re-released on March 24, 2015. Season 3 was re-released on June 30, 2015.

As of 2025, the show's sixth, seventh, and eighth (the final) seasons have yet to be released on DVD.

Season	Ep #	Release date
Season 1	37	October 28, 2008; September 30, 2014 (re-release)
Season 2	38	July 28, 2009; March 24, 2015 (re-release)
Season 3	38	December 1, 2009; June 30, 2015 (re-release)
Season 4	39	December 20, 2011
Season 5	34	December 4, 2012

== Awards and nominations ==
Year	Award	Category	Recipient	Result
1959	Primetime Emmy Awards	Best Actress in a Leading Role (Continuing Character) in a Comedy Series	Donna Reed	Nominated
1960	Primetime Emmy Awards	Outstanding Performance by an Actress in a Series (Lead or Support)	Donna Reed	Nominated
1961	Primetime Emmy Awards	Outstanding Performance by an Actress in a Series (Lead)	Donna Reed	Nominated
1962	Primetime Emmy Awards	Outstanding Continued Performance by an Actress in a Series (Lead)	Donna Reed	Nominated
1963	Golden Globe Awards	Best TV Star – Female	Donna Reed	Won
1994	Young Artist Awards	Former Child Star Lifetime Achievement Award	Shelley Fabares	Won
1996	Young Artist Awards	Best Performance by a Young Actor – Voiceover Role	Chris M. Allport	Nominated
1997	Young Artist Awards	Former Child Star Lifetime Achievement Award	Paul Petersen	Won
2004	TV Land Awards	Favorite Teen Dream – Female	Shelley Fabares	Nominated

== In popular culture ==
In Gilmore Girls season 1 episode 14 "That Damn Donna Reed", Rory and her boyfriend Dean have a disagreement about women's roles after watching an episode of the show. The episode involved Reed's character making a lot of food. Later, Rory dresses up in a dress like Donna Reed and serves Dean a steak dinner.

In the film Major Payne, the theme song to the show plays as Payne fantasizes about an idyllic family life with Emily and Tiger.

A snippet of the show's theme song can also be heard in the film Pleasantville as the scene transitions from a view of the main characters' modern-day suburban neighborhood to David watching the fictional "Pleasantville" show on their TV.
