= The Emperor of Lancashire =

1941 song

Song by George Formby
- Published: 1941
- Recorded: 28 July 1941
- Genre: Comic song
- Label: Regal Zonophone Records
- Songwriter(s): Roger MacDougall

"The Emperor of Lancashire" is a 1941 comic song written by Roger MacDougall for the British comedian George Formby. In it Formby boastfully proclaims about his future success that will one day make him Emperor of the English county of Lancashire. It is filled with a number of references to Lancashire dialect and culture.

It was recorded by Formby on 28 July 1941 for Regal Zonophone Records. It featured in the 1941 film Turned Out Nice Again when it is sung by Formby to the customers of an expensive London nightclub during a visit to the capital for a ladies underwear sales convention.
