= As You Are (play) =

1939 play

- Written by: Hugh Mills; Wells Root
- Original language: English
- Genre: Comedy

Premiere
- Date premiered: 4 December 1939
- Place premiered: Richmond Theatre, Surrey

As You Are is a 1939 comedy play by Hugh Mills and Wells Root. It premiered at Richmond Theatre under the title Stay Just As You Are during the early months of the Second World War. It then transferred to London's West End where it ran for 74 performances from 12 January 1940 to 16 March 1940, initially at the Aldwych Theatre before moving to the Whitehall Theatre. The West End cast included Diana Churchill, Morland Graham, Edward Chapman, Hugh Dempster, Elliott Mason, Muriel George, O.B. Clarence, Vincent Holman, Charles Mortimer and Joan Hickson. A review in the New Statesman considered that despite its complicated plot, the play had many of the "right ingredients" for a successful comedy.

== Adaptation ==
It was adapted for the 1941 film Turned Out Nice Again starring George Formby. His last film made for Ealing Studios it also co-starred Peggy Bryan and Mackenzie Ward, as well as several members of the stage cast including Mason and Chapman. In 1958 it was adapted into an Australian television film As You Are.

== Bibliography ==
- Goble, Alan. The Complete Index to Literary Sources in Film. Walter de Gruyter, 1999.
- Wearing, J.P. The London Stage 1940-1949: A Calendar of Productions, Performers, and Personnel. Rowman & Littlefield, 2014.
