= Be as You Are =

Be As You Are may refer to:

- "Be as You Are (Songs from an Old Blue Chair)", album by Kenny Chesney
- "Be as You Are" (Mike Posner song), song by Mike Posner from his 2016 album At Night, Alone

== See also ==
- As You Are (disambiguation)
