= Gentle Annie (film) =

1944 film

- 1945 theatrical poster
- Directed by: Andrew Marton
- Screenplay by: Lawrence Hazard
- Based on: Gentle Annie; 1942 novel by MacKinlay Kantor
- Produced by: Robert Sisk
- Starring: James Craig; Donna Reed; Marjorie Main
- Cinematography: Charles Salerno, Jr.
- Edited by: Chester Schaeffer
- Music by: David Snell
- Production company: Metro-Goldwyn-Mayer
- Distributed by: Metro-Goldwyn-Mayer
- Release date: May 4, 1945
- Running time: 81 minutes
- Country: United States
- Language: English

Gentle Annie is a Western film, directed in 1944 by Andrew Marton, starring Donna Reed and James Craig. Marjorie Main played the role of Annie Goss and released by Metro-Goldwyn-Mayer. A notable actor in this film is Harry Morgan, who plays Cottonwood Goss. Morgan is best known for his role as Col. Potter in the TV show M*A*S*H.

== Plot ==
A frontierswoman turns her family into a band of bank robbers.

== Cast ==
- James Craig as Lloyd Richland aka Rich Williams
- Donna Reed as Mary Lingen
- Marjorie Main as Annie Goss
- Harry Morgan as Cottonwood Goss (credited as Henry Morgan)
- Paul Langton as Violet Goss
- Barton MacLane as Sheriff Tatum
- John Philliber as Barrow
- Morris Ankrum as Deputy Gansby
- Frank Darien as Jake
- Lee Shumway as Fireman (uncredited)

== Production notes ==
Hollywood Reporter news items and MGM publicity material provide the following information about the production: MGM purchased MacKinlay Kantor's novel in February 1942. Filming began on October 6, 1942, but when director W. S. Van Dyke became ill in early November 1942, production was halted. Tay Garnett was to take over direction on November 9, 1942, but the project was shelved and not revived until June 1944.

The 1942 version was produced by Sam Zimbalist and starred Robert Taylor as Lloyd Richland, Susan Peters as Mary Lingen, Spring Byington as Annie Goss, Charles Grapewin as Barrow and Morris Ankrum as the sheriff. When the project was revived in 1944, the script was rewritten and all the principal crew and cast, except Ankrum and Craig, were replaced.

Production dates: August 7 — early September 1944. Additional scenes began late September 1944.

John Philliber, who plays Barrow in the film, died on November 8, 1944, shortly after filming ended. Gentle Annie was his last picture.
