= The Star-Wagon =

1937 play by Maxwell Anderson

- First edition 1937
- Original language: English
- Written by: Maxwell Anderson
- Genre: Drama
- Setting: eastern Ohio 1902-1930's.

Premiere
- Date: September 29, 1937
- Place: Empire Theatre; New York City, New York

The Star-Wagon was a 1937 Broadway drama written by Maxwell Anderson, produced and staged by Guthrie McClintic, with scenic design by Jo Mielziner and musical direction by Albert Pearl. The general manager was Stanley Gilkey. It ran for 223 performances from September 29, 1937, to April 1938 at the Empire Theatre.

== Plot ==
A fantasy of time-travel. The setting is manufacturing town in Eastern Ohio at what was the present time for the audience in the premiere, 1937. The setting then changes to thirty-five years back in time, 1905, and to a few years before that. Stephen Minch is an inventor and Martha Minch is his wife. A time travel machine is developed, the star-wagon. 1905 is the subsequent time for when the time travelers arrive in the same location, at the dawn of the automobile. The end result of the time traveling the world consist of what is to be, and that is just what happens.

== Cast ==
- Burgess Meredith as Stephen Minch
- Lillian Gish as Martha Minch
- Whitner Bissell as Park
- J. Arthur Young as Mr. Arlington
- Jane Buchanan as Hallie Arlington
- Howard Freeman as Apfel
- Mildred Natwick as Mrs. Rutledge
- Edmund O'Brien as Paul Reiger
- John Philliber as Misty
- Kent Smith as Duffy
- William Garner as Oglethorpe
- Russell Collins as Hanus Wicks
- Edith Smith as Della
- Muriel Starr as Angela and as herb woman
- Barry Kelley as first thug
- Charles Forrester as second thug
- Evelyn Abbott as Christabel
- Alan Anderson as Ripple

== Adaptations ==
The New York Times, January 7, 1938: "The purchase of Maxwell Anderson's The Star Wagon was made today by Selznick International as a vehicle for Janet Gaynor. The play, which is being given on Broadway, will go before the cameras in the Autumn." Gaynor retired from her film career with The Young in Heart, released November 1938, and the motion picture was never made.

The play was videotaped for television as a 1966 installment of NET Playhouse, directed by Karl Genus and starring Orson Bean, Eileen Brennan and Dustin Hoffman.
