= Beyond Mombasa =

1956 film by George Marshall

- Directed by: George Marshall
- Written by: Richard English; Gene Levitt
- Based on: The Mark of the Leopard unpublished novel by James Eastwood
- Produced by: Tony Owen; Adrian D. Worker
- Starring: Cornel Wilde; Donna Reed; Leo Genn
- Cinematography: Freddie Young
- Edited by: Ernest Walter
- Music by: Humphrey Searle
- Production companies: Hemisphere Pictures; Todon Productions
- Distributed by: Columbia Pictures
- Release dates: 29 October 1956 (United Kingdom); 30 May 1957 (New York City); 1 June 1957 (United States)
- Running time: 90 minutes
- Countries: United Kingdom; United States
- Language: English

Beyond Mombasa is a 1956 Technicolor adventure film directed by George Marshall and starring Cornel Wilde, Donna Reed and Leo Genn. It was set in Kenya and shot on location there and at the Elstree Studios near London. The film's sets were designed by the art director Elliot Scott.

== Plot ==
Matt Campbell arrives in Kenya, where his brother George is reported missing. A man named Ralph Hoyt tells him that George has been killed by members of the "Leopard Men" cult.

Matt is introduced to Hoyt's niece, Ann Wilson, an anthropologist, who is puzzled by Matt's reluctance to go to Mombasa for his brother's funeral. Matt also meets big-game hunter Gil Rossi, who was helping George search for a valuable uranium mine. Hoyt claims the mine doesn't exist.

Another business partner, Elliott Hastings, claims that George's body has been cremated but he did find a map. An expedition beyond Mombasa is formed, guided by Ketimi and other local tribesmen. A shared experience with a charge of hippos brings Matt and Ann closer together, while Gil is nearly killed by a crocodile before it is shot by Hastings.

Tribesmen wearing leopard disguises attack Hastings that night. Ketimi is then killed by a poison dart, causing the other tribesmen to leave. Locating a shaft to the mine, Elliot, Matt and Ann descend into it. She discovers to her horror that Hoyt, her uncle, has murdered Gil with a blow gun. Hoyt confesses to killing Ketimi and paying other natives to disguise themselves as the mythical Leopard Men.

Matt and Ann are about to become the next victims, but Ketimi's fellow tribesmen reappear and take their revenge.

== Cast ==
- Cornel Wilde as Matt Campbell
- Donna Reed as Ann Wilson
- Leo Genn as Ralph Hoyt
- Ron Randell as Elliot Hastings
- Christopher Lee as Gil Rossi
- Dan Jackson as Ketimi

== Production ==
=== Development ===
The film was made by Hemisphere, an offshoot of Columbia under the supervision of Mike Frankovich which shot films outside the US. They co produced with Todon, the production company of agent-turned producer Tony Owens and his wife, actor Donna Reed.

It was originally named Mark of the Leopard. It was then known as Mombasa and Black Mamba. It was the only one of Todon's British pictures to star Donna Reed, although she co owned the company.

The film was to star Aldo Ray but he turned down the role. As a result, Columbia put him on suspension. Cornel Wilde replaced him in December 1955. Leo Genn signed to do the film after pulling out of Run for the Sun. A key support role went to Ron Randell.

=== Shooting ===
Filming took place in the studio in London and on location in Africa. It was to have begun in July 1955. Filming didn't start until February 1956.

After the film was completed, Owen said all of his films "stink - but they made money." However he said Beyond Mombasa "is the first one I've done that isn't lousy - and I'm worried."

== Reception ==
The film was a box office disappointment.

== See also ==
- List of American films of 1956
