= Turned Out Nice Again =

1941 film by Marcel Varnel

- George Formby, Peggy Bryan and Elliott Mason in the film
- Directed by: Marcel Varnel
- Written by: (screenplay) Basil Dearden, John Dighton, Austin Melford
- Based on: As You Are by Hugh Mills and Wells Root
- Produced by: Michael Balcon & Basil Dearden
- Starring: George Formby; Peggy Bryan
- Music by: Ernest Irving; Eddie Latta; Bretton Byrd
- Production companies: Associated Talking Pictures; Ealing Studios
- Distributed by: Ealing Distribution (UK); United Artists (UK)
- Release date: 29 June 1941
- Running time: 81 minutes
- Country: United Kingdom
- Language: English

Turned Out Nice Again is a 1941 British comedy film directed by Marcel Varnel and starring George Formby and Peggy Bryan. It was written by Austin Melford (and, uncredited, Basil Dearden and John Dighton) adapted from the 1939 play As You Are by Hugh Mills and Wells Root. It was made at Ealing Studios.

== Plot ==
George Pearson, an employee at an underwear factory, is caught between his modern wife and his meddling mother. After buying a special yarn and getting his wife to promote it, he has an argument with his boss, Mr Dawson who insults Pearson's wife and refuses to apologise. Pearson then resigns. After finding out that the yarn is actually worth a fair amount, Mr Dawson tries to buy it from Pearson but he has some competition.

== Cast ==
- George Formby as George Pearson
- Peggy Bryan as Lydia Pearson
- Edward Chapman as Uncle Arnold
- Elliott Mason as Mrs Pearson
- Mackenzie Ward as Gerald Dawson
- O. B. Clarence as Mr Dawson
- Ronald Ward as Nelson
- John Salew as Largon
- Wilfrid Hyde-White as removal man
- Hay Petrie as drunk
- Michael Rennie as diner

== Songs ==
The songs performed by Formby in the film are:

- "Auntie Maggie's Remedy" (Formby/Eddie Latta)
- "You Can't Go Wrong in These" (Roger MacDougal)
- "The Emperor of Lancashire" (MacDougal)
- "You're Everything To Me" (MacDougal)

The song "Turned Out Nice Again" does not feature in the film.

== Release ==
Turned Out Nice Again premiered at the London Pavilion Cinema on 29 June 1941. It was re-released in 1945.

== Reception ==
The Monthly Film Bulletin wrote: "Admirers of George Formby will find little for complaint in this film, though it differs from his previous comedies in that the story is less improbable than usual and contains very little slapstick. George himself acts in the typical Formby manner, Peggy Bryan as Peggy, his wife, gives a promising performance in her first big film part, and the supporting players have been well chosen. The direction is competent, but the studio nature of some of the settings is very obvious. Some of the gags have double meanings and may be thought unsuitable for children by careful parents."

Kine Weekly wrote: "Altogether a bright, cheery and human film which should please everybody."

The Daily Film Renter wrote: "George at the top of his form. Film with rich farcical incident and with plot that holds together. ... Something happening all the time, and most of the dialogue, as well as all the action, has point and pith."

Variety wrote: "Producers have gone outside of the usual George Formby slapstick setup, serving the toothy comic in a domestic background with a credible yarn ... Film makes a good enough claim for extra terratorial attention, programmers should find it ok for chuckles, simple comedy and sound playing among the support."
