= Tony Owen (producer) =

American journalist

Tony Owen (May 2, 1907 – May 12, 1984) was an American agent and producer, who was married to Donna Reed.

== Biography ==
Owen was born in Chicago and worked in that city as a journalist. In the late 1930s he produced game programs for the Detroit Lions, and in 1940 became a vice president of the football club.

He served in the army during the war, but was invalided out. He moved to Los Angeles in 1942 and got work as an agent.

He married Donna Reed in 1945 and they had four children (two were adopted).

=== Todon Productions ===
Owen and Reed formed their own company, Todon Productions. Owen moved into film production with Duel in the Jungle (1953). It established a formula of using two American leads, an American director, and 80% British crew, to qualify for the subsidies of being a British film and because it was cheaper to make. "As an independent I can give everybody a percentage", said Owen. "This includes a star who will take a cut in lieu of his regular salary of say, $300,000." Owen added that "I believe the American public loves seeing foreign backgrounds. They're a definite plus value."

Duel in the Jungle made $3 million. This launched Todon on a series of films.

He followed it with two films directed by Ken Hughes and distributed by Allied Artists: Little Red Monkey (1955), with Richard Conte, and Timeslip (1955) with Gene Nelson and Faith Domergue.

Then came Portrait of Alison (1956) with Terry Moore directed by Guy Green; Dial 999 (1956), with Gene Nelson directed by Montgomery Tully; and The Intimate Stranger (1956) with Richard Basehart and Mary Murphy.

In 1956, a report said Todon was "perhaps the biggest Anglo-American company next to Warwick." As he made Beyond Mombasa Owen said he'd produced six films and "all of them stink but they made money... But not the final one I made with my wife. In fact, this is the first one I've done that isn't lousy – and I'm worried."

"I'm no genius", he said later. "I just wanted to make commercial films."

By May 1956, Todon had made six films up to Beyond Mombassa. That month Owen said Todon would make eight films with an overall budget of $9,250,000. These included Wherever You Are by Stirling Silliphant (Naples), Twist of the Night (to be shot in Africa), The Man Inside from a novel by Victor Canning (Portugal), The Last Pursuit (about a train robbery to be filmed in Bavaria with British Leion), The Eddie Calvert Story (England), and It's Not Cricket with Ron Randell (England).

That month it was announced Maxwell Setton would run the company in London, to make six films, starting with The Nylon Web which became Town on Trial. Others included The Long Haul (1957) with Victor Mature and Diana Dors, directed by Hughes; I Was Monty's Double (1958) with John Mills directed by John Guillermin;

Owen said "the last one [film] died the death of a dog at the box office. So I came back and started working in television."

Owen developed a series for his wife where she would play the secretary of the Secretary of State. A number of scripts were written but they did not feel confident, and eventually developed a show where Reed played the wife of a pediatrician. This became the hugely successful The Donna Reed Show. he died in 1984 at 77

== Filmography ==
- The Traveling Saleswoman (1950)
- Duel in the Jungle (1954)
- The Case of the Red Monkey (1955) a.k.a. Little Red Monkey
- Timeslip (1955) a.k.a. The Atomic Man
- Postmark for Danger (1955) a.k.a. Portrait of Alison
- Dial 999 (1955) a.k.a. The Way Out
- Finger of Guilt (1956) a.k.a. The Intimate Stranger
- Beyond Mombasa (1956)
- Town on Trial (1957)
- I Was Monty's Double (1958)
- The Long Haul (1957)
- The Donna Reed Show (1958–66)

=== Unmade films ===
- Twist of Night (1956) from a book by Roger McDermott
- The Man Inside (1956) from a novel bu Victor Canning
- The Last Pursuit (1956)
- It's Not Cricket (1956) by Lawrence Brollings
- Wherever You Are (1956) by Stirling Silliphant to star Reed and Rosanno Brazzi
- The Unhappy Warrior (1957) with Van Johnson
- The Eddie Calvert Story (1956)
- Wherever You Are (1957) – a drama of "transplanted eyes"
- biopic of Joseph Conrad.
- life story of pianist Roger Williams
