= Wells Root =

American film director

- Born: March 21, 1900; Buffalo, New York
- Died: March 9, 1993 (aged 92); Los Angeles
- Occupations: Screenwriter and lecturer

Wells Crosby Root (March 21, 1900 – March 9, 1993) was an American screenwriter and lecturer. In the mid-1930s he was involved with the Screen Writers Guild and in the 1950s the University of Southern California asked him to teach Film and Television Writing Technique, where he worked during the next twenty years. He co-authored the 1939 comedy play As You Are with Hugh Mills.

== Filmography ==
=== Films ===
Year	Film	Credit	Notes
1928	Varsity	Screenplay By	Co-Wrote Screenplay with "Howard Estabrook" and "George Marion Jr."
1930	Peacock Alley	Screenplay By	Co-Wrote Screenplay with "Frances Hyland" and "Carey Wilson"
1930	Chasing Rainbows	Screenplay By	Based on the story "Road Show" By "Robert Hopkins" and "Bess Meredyth", Co-Wrote Screenplay with "Al Boasberg", "Kenyon Nicholson", and "Charles Reisner"
1930	The Rogue Song	Suggested By	
1930	The Storm	Written By	Co-Wrote Screenplay with "John Huston", "Charles Logue", and "Tom Reed"
1931	Politics	Screenplay By	Co-Wrote Screenplay with "Robert E. Hopkins"
1931	The Prodigal	Story By, Screenplay By	Co-Wrote Screenplay with "Bess Meredyth"
1932	Tiger Shark	Screenplay By	
1932	Bird of Paradise	Screenplay By	Co-Wrote Screenplay with "Wanda Tuchock" and "Leonard Praskins"
1933	I Cover the Waterfront	Screenplay By	Based on the novel "I Cover the Waterfront" by Max Miller
1933	Night Flight	Screenplay By (Uncredited)	
1933	Racetrack	Story By	Co-Wrote Story with "J. Walter Ruben"
1934	Black Moon	Screenplay By	Based on a short story By "Clements Ripley"
1934	Flirtation	Written By	Co-Wrote Screenplay with "Leo Birinski"
1934	Stingaree	Screenplay By	Based on the novel by "E.W. Hornung", Co-Wrote Screenplay with "Becky Gardiner", "Garrett Fort", "Agnes Christine Johnston", and "Dwight Taylor"
1934	Paris Interlude	Screenplay By	Based on the play "Paris Interlude" By S. J. Perelman And Laura Perelman
1935	Public Hero ﹟1	Screenplay By, Story By	Co-Wrote Story with "J. Walter Ruben"
1935	Shadow Of Doubt	Screenplay By	Based on the novel by "Arthur Somers Roche"
1935	Pursuit	Screenplay By	Based on a story By "Lawrence G. Blochman"
1936	The Bold Caballero	Written By, Directed By	
1936	The Beloved Vagabond	Screenplay By	
1936	Sworn Enemy	Screenplay By	
1937	The Prisoner of Zenda	Screenplay By	Based on the novel of the same name by "Anthony Hope", Co-Wrote Screenplay with "John L. Balderston", "Edward Rose", "Donald Ogden Stewart", "Ben Hecht", and "Sidney Howard"
1939	Man of Conquest	Written By	Co-Wrote Screenplay with "Harold Shumate", "Jan Isbell Fortune", and "Edward E. Paramore Jr."
1939	Sergeant Madden	Screenplay By	
1939	Thunder Afloat	Screenplay By	Co-Wrote Screenplay with "Harvey S. Haislip"
1940	Flight Command	Screenplay By	Co-Wrote Screenplay with "Harvey S. Haislip"
1941	The Bad Man	Screenplay By	Based on the play By "Porter Emerson Browne"
1941	The Get-Away	Screenplay By, Story By	Co-Wrote Screenplay with "W. R. Burnett" and "J. Walter Ruben"
1941	Turned Out Nice Again	Screenplay By	
1942	Mokey	Screenplay By, Directed By	Co-Wrote Screenplay with "Jan Fortune"
1942	Tennessee Johnson	Screenplay By	Co-Wrote Screenplay with "John L. Balderston"
1943	The Man from Down Under	Screenplay By	Co-Wrote Screenplay with "Tom Seller"
1943	Salute to the Marines	Screenplay By	
1948	As You Are	Screenplay By	
1948	Movies Are Adventures	Story By (Uncredited)	Short
1951	The Cinematographer	Story By (Uncredited)	
1951	Red Fury	Written By	
1951	Stronghold	Written By	
1952	The Prisoner Of Zenda	Story By	
1954	Magnificent Obsession	Screenplay By	Based on the novel "Magnificent Obsession" by "Lloyd C. Douglas", Co-Wrote Screenplay with "Sarah Y. Mason", "Victor Heerman", and "
1957	Hell Ship Mutiny	Screenplay By	Co-Wrote Screenplay with "DeVallon Scott"
1961	Secret of Deep Harbor	Screenplay by	Based on the novel by "Max Miller", Co-Wrote Screenplay with "Owen Harris"
1966	Texas Across the River	Screenplay By	Co-Wrote Screenplay with "Harold Greene" and "Ben Starr"

=== Television ===
Year	TV Series	Credit	Notes
1951–55	Fireside Theatre	Writer	7 Episodes
1952	Adventures Of Superman	Writer	1 Episode
1954–55	Captain Midnight	Writer	6 Episodes
1955	Stage 7	Writer	1 Episode
1955	Tales of the Texas Rangers	Writer	
1955	TV Reader's Digest	Writer	3 Episodes
1955-56	Brave Eagle	Writer	3 Episodes
1955-56	The Life and Legend of Wyatt Earp	Writer	2 Episodes
1955-56	Jungle Jim	Writer	2 Episodes
1956	Conflict	Writer	1 Episode
1956	Studio 57	Writer	1 Episode
1956	General Electric Theater	Writer	1 Episode
1956–57	The Lone Ranger	Writer	3 Episodes
1957	Casey Jones	Writer	1 Episode
1957	Ford Theatre	Writer	1 Episode
1957	Sugarfoot	Writer	1 Episode
1957–59	Colt .45	Writer	2 Episodes
1957–62	Cheyenne	Writer	5 Episodes
1958-60	Bat Masterson	Writer	7 Episodes
1958-60	Wanted: Dead or Alive	Writer	2 Episodes
1959	The Restless Gun	Writer	1 Episode
1959	The Deputy	Writer	1 Episode
1959–60	Tombstone Territory	Writer	3 Episodes
1959–61	Maverick	Writer	4 Episodes
1960	Bronco	Writer	1 Episode
1961	Laramie	Writer	1 Episode
1961	Whiplash	Writer	1 Episode
1962	Lawman	Writer	1 Episode
1964-65	Combat!	Writer	2 Episodes
1964-65	The Rogues	Writer	2 Episodes
1966	Tarzan	Writer	1 Episode
