= Timeslip (1955 film) =

1955 British film by Ken Hughes

- U.S. theatrical release poster
- Directed by: Ken Hughes
- Written by: Charles Eric Maine
- Based on: "Time Slip" by Charles Eric Maine
- Produced by: Alec C. Snowden executive Nat Cohen; Stuart Levy
- Starring: Gene Nelson; Faith Domergue
- Cinematography: A. T. Dinsdale
- Edited by: Geoffrey Muller
- Production companies: Anglo Guild Productions; Todon Productions (uncredited)
- Distributed by: Anglo-Amalgamated
- Release date: November 1955
- Running time: 93 minutes
- Country: United Kingdom
- Language: English

Timeslip (U.S. title The Atomic Man) is a 1955 British black-and-white science fiction film directed by Ken Hughes and starring Gene Nelson and Faith Domergue. Produced by Alec C. Snowden, it was written by Charles Eric Maine.

In the UK, the film was distributed by Anglo-Amalgamated. In 1956 the film was shortened from 93 minutes to 76 minutes and distributed in the U.S. by Allied Artists Pictures in some areas as a double feature with Invasion of the Body Snatchers.

== Plot ==
An injured man is pulled from the Thames. He has been shot in the back and is barely alive. The science correspondent of an illustrated magazine recognises him as a nuclear physicist. But the physicist is found alive and well and working at his laboratory. When the injured man is photographed, his pictures show a strange glow surrounding him, and when he recovers enough to be questioned, his answers make no sense. It transpires that his perception of time is 7.5 seconds ahead of that of his interrogator, to the extent that he answers questions just before they are asked.

The correspondent and his photographer girlfriend try to solve the puzzle, and in doing so uncover international industrial espionage and a terrible threat to the atomic research institute.

== Cast ==
- Gene Nelson as Mike Delaney
- Faith Domergue as Jill Robowski
- Peter Arne as Dr. Stephen Rayner/Jarvis
- Joseph Tomelty as Detective Inspector Cleary
- Donald Gray as Robert Maitland
- Vic Perry as Emmanuel Vasquo
- Paul Hardtmuth as Dr. Bressler
- Martin Wyldeck as Dr. Preston
- Leonard Williams as Detective Sergeant Haines
- Charles Hawtrey as office boy

== Production ==
The script for the film was a substantial reworking by Charles Eric Maine of his BBC TV play Time Slip, which was transmitted live on 25 November 1953, and not recorded. In the original play, Jack Mallory (Jack Rodney) dies and is brought back to life with an adrenaline injection, but this results in his perception of time being 4.7 seconds ahead of everybody else's, so he is able to answer their questions before they are even asked. His psychiatrist "cures" him by smothering him to death and then reviving him with a second – but more carefully measured – dose of adrenalin.

The film was partially funded by its UK distributor Anglo-Amalgamated. It was a production of Todon Productions, the American company, although they are not credited. Star Gene Nelson had been in two musicals, So This Is Paris and Oklahoma!, and this was his first serious dramatic lead. He was reportedly cast after Tony Owen of Todon saw Nelson on an episode of Studio One.

Filming started in England on 4 February 1955. It was shot at Merton Park Studios. Original titles include The Way Out.

== The Isotope Man ==
Maine turned the script into a novel, The Isotope Man, published in 1957. It would be the first of three novels about reporter Mike Delaney. The New York Times called the novel "fairly crude and preposterous but lively enough". The Los Angeles Times called it "near perfect entertainment for the radioactive age."

== Critical reception ==
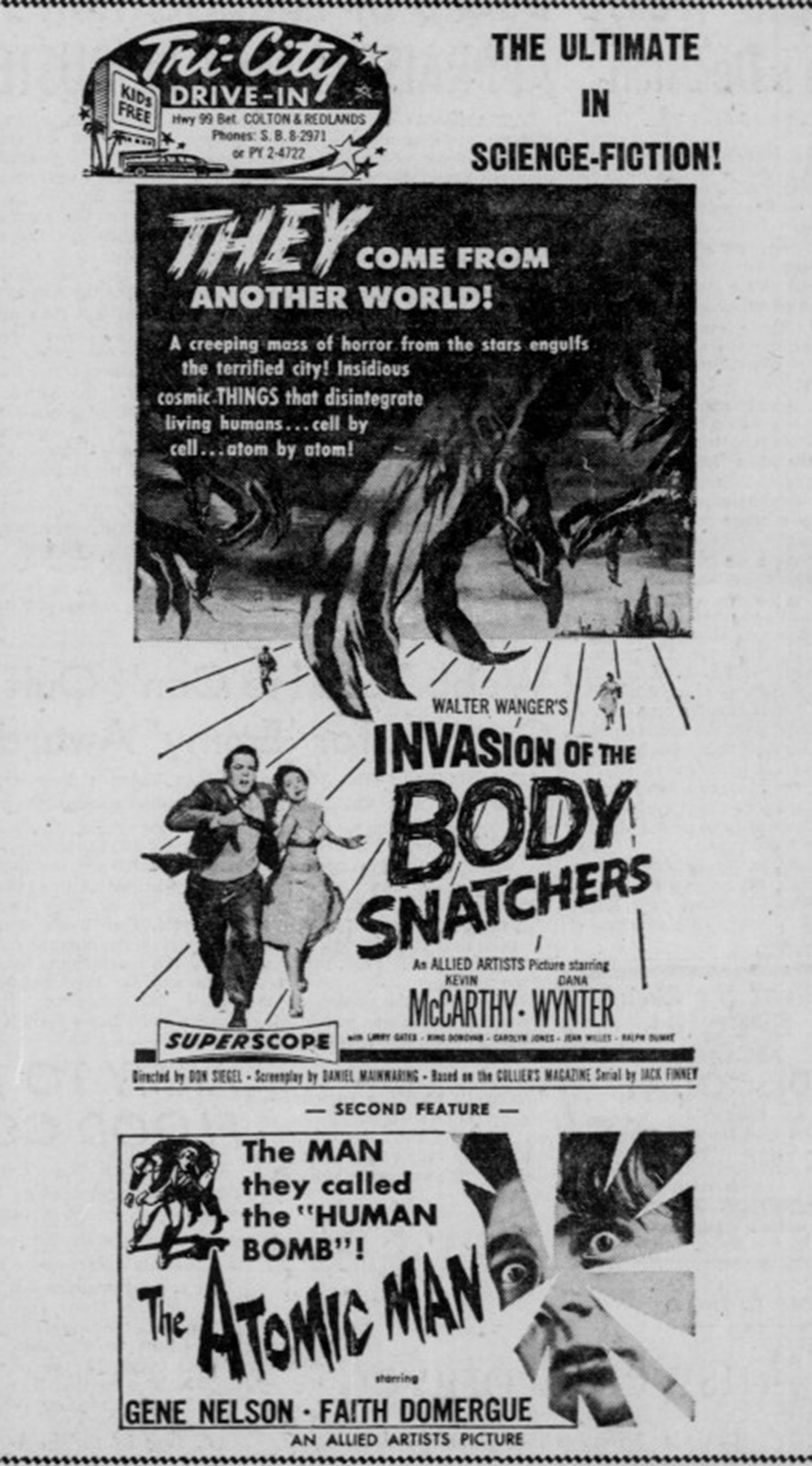
Drive-in theater advertisement, 1956, for a program featuring Invasion of the Body Snatchers and The Atomic Man (the American title of Timeslip)

The Monthly Film Bulletin wrote: "Quite a creditable addition to the British school of 'scientific' thrillers. As in his recent The Brain Machine [1956], Ken Hughes' direction is brisk and assured, although he has not here been very well served by the script; the scenes of light relief in particular are somewhat tame. Tension is well sustained in the first half of the film, but later there are rather an overwhelming number of revelations and interest flags as a result of a too sudden onrush of events. Timeslip scores over some of its predecessors, though, in its handling of minor characters, notably in the hospital sequences. Gene Nelson gives a good-humoured performance as the reporter, and Faith Domergue partners him quite competently."

TV Guide called it a "dumb movie with an interesting premise."

AllMovie thought its "absolutely fascinating premise" unfortunately translated into "lack of imagination in the script"; but from an able cast, Faith Domergue was "especially welcome", and the reviewer concluded "The budget is clearly low, but (Ken) Hughes does well with what he has."

The Radio Times Guide to Films gave the film 2/5 stars, writing: "In this quaint British sci-fi oddity, a radiation overdose propels an atomic scientist seven seconds into the future. Numerous muddled plotlines intertwine, with gangsters and spies trying to exploit his reaction to events before they happen, but nothing too interesting is done with the nifty premise."
