= The Get-Away (1941 film) =

1941 film by Edward Buzzell

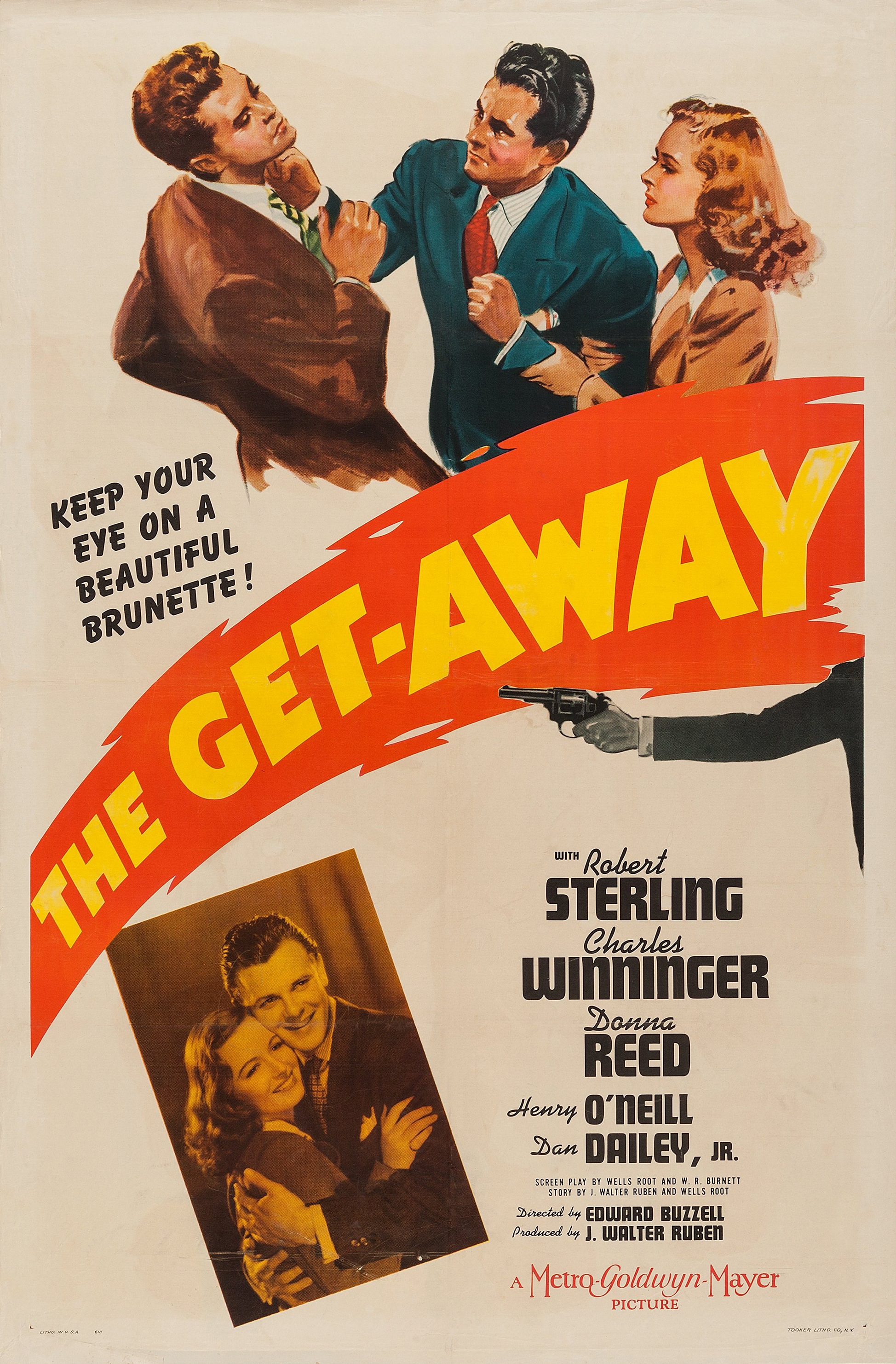
- Theatrical release poster
- Directed by: Edward Buzzell; Richard Rosson (uncredited)
- Written by: J. Walter Ruben; Wells Root
- Produced by: J. Walter Ruben
- Starring: Robert Sterling; Charles Winninger; Donna Reed
- Cinematography: Sidney Wagner
- Edited by: James E. Newcom
- Music by: Daniele Amfitheatrof
- Production company: Metro-Goldwyn-Mayer
- Distributed by: Loew's Inc.
- Release date: June 13, 1941
- Running time: 89 minutes
- Country: United States
- Language: English

The Get-Away is a 1941 American crime drama film directed by Edward Buzzell and starring Robert Sterling, Charles Winninger and Donna Reed. Produced by Metro-Goldwyn-Mayer, it is a remake of the 1935 film Public Hero No. 1. It has been listed as a precursor of film noir.

== Synopsis ==
A federal agent goes undercover in a prison to infiltrate the circle of a criminal and gain information about him and his gang. He gains his confidence and the two take part of an escape together. On the outside they encounter the criminal's sister who naively sees her brother as a petty thief who can be reformed rather than the hardened murderer he really is.

== Cast ==
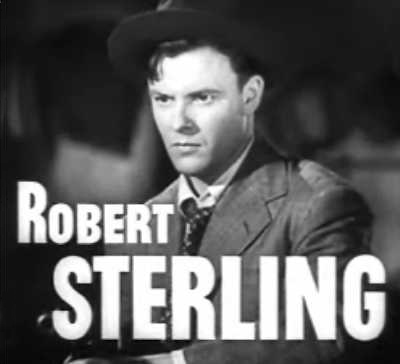
Robert Sterling in The Get-Away

- Robert Sterling as Jeff Crane
- Charles Winninger as Doctor Josiah Glass
- Donna Reed as Maria Theresa 'Terry' O'Reilly
- Henry O'Neill as Warden Alcott
- Dan Dailey as Sonny 'Dinkie' Black
- Don Douglas as Jim Duff
- Ernest Whitman as 'Moose'
- Grant Withers as Parker
- Chester Gan as Sam
- Charles Wagenheim as Hutch
- Guy Kingsford as George
- Matty Fain as Bryan
- Clara Blandick as Mrs. Higgins
- Jack Luden as Agent Higgins
- Joe Yule as McMannis, a Bartender
- May McAvoy as Duff's Secretary
- Wade Boteler as Prison Yard Captain
- Veda Ann Borg as Black's Dance Hall Pickup

Jewel McGowan as Jitterbug Dancer, (uncredited). Dean Collins as Jitterbug Dancer, (uncredited).

== Reception ==
In a contemporary review for The New York Times, critic Bosley Crowther called the film "routine fiction in the cops-and-robbers vein" and "deadly dreary stuff, pounded out from a blueprint, and poorly, almost childishly, played."

== Bibliography ==
- Spicer, Andrew. Historical Dictionary of Film Noir. Scarecrow Press, 2010.
