= John Philliber =

American actor (1873–1944)

John Philliber (July 6, 1873 – November 6, 1944), was an American actor. Born in Elkhart, Indiana, Philliber was a stage actor for most of his career, but in his last year of life made several appearances in films, alluding to his old age, best remembered for his role as 'Pop Benson' in René Clair's classic fantasy comedy It Happened Tomorrow. He died in his hometown of Elkhart aged 71.

== Broadway roles ==
- Winterset (1935) as hobo
- High Tor (1937) as Pieter
- The Star-Wagon (1937) as Misty
- Two On An Island (1940) as husband in married couples, New Yorkers & out-of-towners

== Filmography ==
- A Lady Takes a Chance (1943) - Storekeeper
- The Impostor (1944) - Mortemart
- Double Indemnity (1944) - Joe Peters
- Ladies of Washington (1944) - Mother Henry
- It Happened Tomorrow (1944) - Pop Benson
- Summer Storm (1944) - Polycarp - Petroff's Butler
- Three Is a Family (1944) - Dr. Bartell
- Gentle Annie (1944) - Barrow (final film role)
