= It Happened Tomorrow =

1944 film by René Clair

- Original film poster
- Directed by: René Clair
- Screenplay by: Dudley Nichols; René Clair; Helene Fraenkel (add'l dialogue)
- Based on: One-act play: "The Jest of Haha Laba" by Lord Dunsany; Unproduced screenplay: Hugh Wedlock; Howard Snyder; Ideas: Lewis R. Foster
- Produced by: Arnold Pressburger
- Starring: Dick Powell; Linda Darnell; Jack Oakie
- Cinematography: Archie Stout
- Edited by: Fred Pressburger
- Music by: Robert Stolz
- Production company: Arnold Pressburger Films
- Distributed by: United Artists
- Release date: March 27, 1944
- Running time: 85 minutes
- Country: United States
- Language: English
- Budget: $800,000

It Happened Tomorrow is a 1944 American fantasy film directed by René Clair, starring Dick Powell, Linda Darnell and Jack Oakie, and featuring Edgar Kennedy and John Philliber. It is based on the one-act play "The Jest of Haha Laba" by Lord Dunsany.

== Plot ==
Lawrence and Sylvia Stevens are celebrating their 50th wedding anniversary. In a flashback to the 1890s, Lawrence Stevens is an obituary writer unhappy with his job. He is given tomorrow's evening newspaper by an elderly newspaper man named Pop Benson, though he does not bother to read it.

After work, he and his co-workers go to see a mind-reading act starring the "Great Sigolini" (Oscar Smith) and his beautiful assistant Sylvia. Lawrence is enchanted with Sylvia and manages to get her to agree to a date the next day. He finally notices the newspaper's date, but dismisses it as a mistake. However, he notes the weather forecast is for an unseasonable snowfall, which occurs, and later an advertisement for a waiter which precedes the firing of one. Then he reads about a robbery at a theater's box office during a performance in an article under his byline. He writes the article beforehand. His editor refuses to publish it at first, until a policeman comes by and confirms the robbery.

This causes Police Inspector Mulrooney to put him in jail, convinced he could only have known about the robbery by being a member of the gang who pulled it off. Stevens and his new girlfriend Sylvia have a number of adventures, until her uncle mistakenly thinks that Stevens has consorted with his niece in her boarding house room. The uncle attempts to intimidate Stevens into marrying her, not knowing that Stevens has come to him to ask for her hand.

Stevens gets another newspaper from Pop Benson, intending to use it to pick horses at the racetrack, to win enough money to get married. Unfortunately, he also reads a story about his own death that night, so he and Sylvia get married immediately and head off to the track with her uncle. Stevens bets on winner after winner, amassing $60,000, which is then stolen on their way back to town. They give chase but are arrested for speeding. Stevens hopes for more help from Benson, but learns that the old man died two days ago, even before Stevens received the first newspaper.

Stevens tries his best to avoid the hotel lobby where his death is supposed to take place, but circumstances keep pushing him in that direction. He spots the man who stole his money and chases him on foot through the streets and over the rooftops, until they both fall through the chimney that leads to the very hotel lobby he's been trying to avoid. A gunfight breaks out, and the thief is shot and killed. Because he has Stevens' wallet on him, he is at first identified as the newspaperman, and his newspaper prints an erroneous story saying that their star reporter has been killed. When a reporter finds out the truth, the newspaper has already hit the streets; and it is this edition that he had received from Pop.

Stevens does not die in the hotel lobby, and he and Sylvia celebrate their 50th wedding anniversary with the scene that begins the film.

== Cast ==
- Dick Powell as Lawrence Stevens
- Linda Darnell as Sylvia Smith
- Jack Oakie as Uncle Oscar Smith
- Edgar Kennedy as Inspector Mulrooney
- John Philliber as Pop Benson
- Edward Brophy as Jake Schomberg, man taking bets at racetrack
- George Cleveland as Mr. Gordon, newspaper editor
- Sig Ruman as Mr. Beckstein, circus scout
- Paul Guilfoyle as Shep (the thief)
- George Chandler as Bob
- Eddie Acuff as Jim
- Robert Dudley as Justice of the Peace

== Production ==
Director and producer Frank Capra originally purchased the rights to Hugh Wedlock and Howard Snyder's story, but when he discovered the concept was similar to that in Lord Dunsany's 20-year-old one act play, he bought it as well; later, when he was going into the Army to serve in World War II, he sold both to Arnold Pressburger. Pressburger approached René Clair about directing the film, and the two hired Clair's friend Dudley Nichols to assist in writing the script. They set the time period in the 1890s to avoid dealing with the war.

Clair initially wanted Cary Grant for the lead role, but wound up with Dick Powell, who was on the verge of altering his screen persona from a lightweight musical-comedy "juvenile" to a harder one, playing tough guy private detective Philip Marlowe in Murder My Sweet later that year, followed by a series of film noirs.

Although It Happened Tomorrow was far from Clair's favorite, he was later to write that "[t]he last twenty minutes are the best thing I did in Hollywood." The ending, especially, which hinges on a mistake in the newspaper from the future, had a personal connection for Clair, since he was fired from his first job as a reporter when he made up a story which was the opposite of what actually happened; Nichols was a former newsman as well.

== Reception ==
It Happened Tomorrow was a success at the box office. Film historian Jeff Stafford noted that the critical response in the United States was "complimentary but reserved". Variety described it as "diverting escapist entertainment, with many sparkling moments and episodes along the line." In France, however, the film was a "major critical success".

== Award nominations ==
Robert Stolz was nominated for the Academy Award for Best Music, Scoring of a Dramatic or Comedy Picture, while Jack Whitney was nominated for Best Sound, Recording.

== Adaptations ==
It Happened Tomorrow was adapted as a radio play for the July 3, 1944 episode of Lux Radio Theater with Don Ameche and Anne Baxter, the September 25, 1944 episode of The Screen Guild Theater with Dick Powell and Linda Darnell reprising their original roles and on the October 9, 1946 episode of Academy Award Theater, starring Eddie Bracken and Ann Blyth.

== See also ==
- List of American films of 1944
- Communication from the future
- List of ghost films
- Early Edition
