= Peggy Bryan =

English actress (1916–1996)

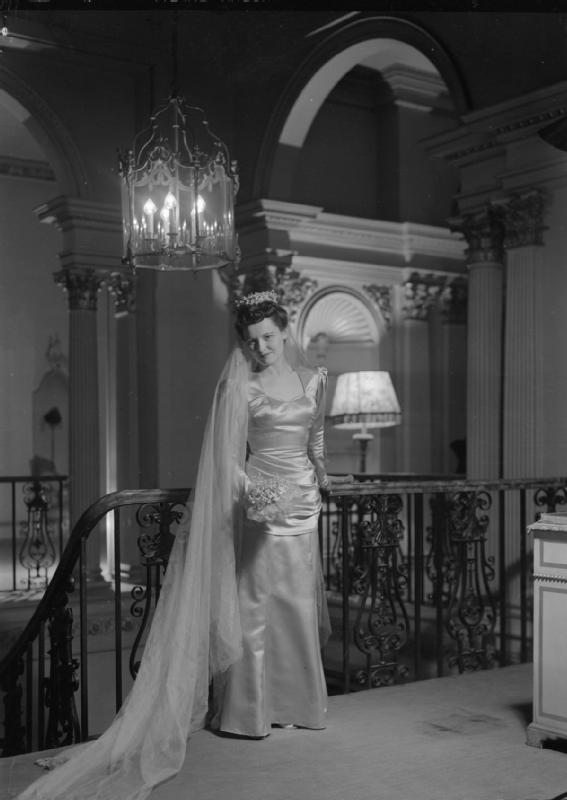
Peggy Bryan modelling a wedding dress for her role in Dead of Night. The dress was designed for her by couturier Bianca Mosca

Margaret Eileen Bryan (3 January 1916 – 12 January 1996) was an English film and stage actress, born in Birmingham, England. She appeared in many films, including most notably as the screen wife of George Formby in the comedy film Turned Out Nice Again (1941). She married cinematographer Wilkie Cooper, with whom she had three sons.

== Biography ==
Peggy Bryan attended Windermere College with her first employment position as an elocution teacher at Highclare College located in Sutton Coldfield. Although her family did not have a theatrical background, she gained considerable amateur stage experience and eventually decided on an acting career. She applied to the London Academy of Music and Drama and was awarded a six-month scholarship.

Bryan gained her first professional acting role on 16 December 1937 as the character of Puck in a scene from William Shakespeare's A Midsummer Night's Dream at the Royal performance in aid of King George's Actors Pension Fund.

Bryan performed at Regent's Park, London in 1938, repeating the role of Puck and also playing Ariel in The Tempest. West End roles soon followed in April Clouds and Glorious Morning in which she succeeded Jessica Tandy. Bryan appeared in The Springtime of Others, Q, and The Fanatics during 1939, and five Shakespearean plays at Stratford on Avon in 1940.

Bryan suffered from ill health in the final 20 years of her life. She died in West Sussex on 12 January 1996, aged 80.

== Filmography ==
- 1941 – Turned Out Nice Again
- 1941 – My Wife's Family
- 1945 – Dead of Night
- 1952 – Emergency Call

== Stage roles ==
- 1938 – April Clouds
- 1938 – Glorious Morning
- 1938 – The Tempest
- 1939 – The Springtime of Others
- 1939 – Q
- 1939 – The Fanatics
- 1940 – Stratford on Avon in five roles
- 1942 – The Little Minister
- 1942 – The Professor's Love Story
- 1943 – An Ideal Husband
- 1945 – Yellow Sands
