= Donna Reed =

American actress (1921–1986)

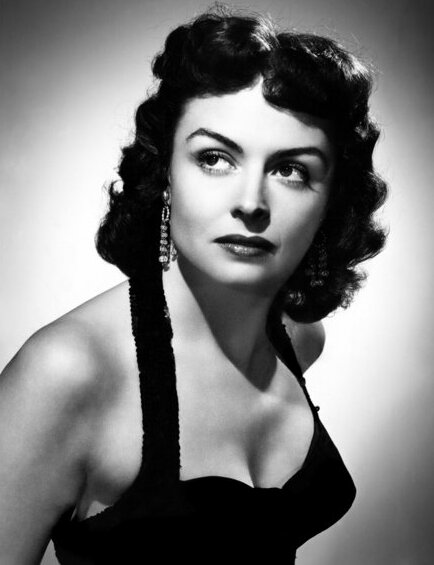
- Reed in 1953
- Born: Donna Belle Mullenger; January 27, 1921; Denison, Iowa, U.S.
- Died: January 14, 1986 (aged 64); Beverly Hills, California, U.S.
- Resting place: Pierce Brothers Westwood Village Memorial Park and Mortuary
- Education: Los Angeles City College (AA)
- Occupation: Actress
- Years active: 1941–1986
- Known for: – Academy Award as Lorene in From Here to Eternity – Mary Hatch Bailey in It's a Wonderful Life – Golden Globe Award as Donna Stone in The Donna Reed Show
- Spouses: William J. Tuttle (m. 1943; div. 1945) Tony Owen (m. 1945; div. 1971) Grover Asmus (m. 1974)
- Children: 4
- Awards: Academy Award; Golden Globe Award

Donna Reed (born Donna Belle Mullenger; January 27, 1921 – January 14, 1986) was an American actress. Her career spanned more than 40 years and included appearances in over 40 films. She is best known for playing Mary Hatch Bailey in Frank Capra's Christmas classic It's a Wonderful Life (1946), and for her Academy Award–winning performance as Lorene in Fred Zinnemann's war drama From Here to Eternity (1953).

Reed is also known for her work in television, notably as Donna Stone, a middle-class American mother and housewife in the sitcom The Donna Reed Show (1958–1966) whose character was more assertive and complex than most other television mothers of the era. She received numerous Emmy Award nominations for this role and the Golden Globe Award for Best TV Star in 1963. Later in her career, Reed replaced Barbara Bel Geddes as Miss Ellie Ewing Farlow in the 1984–1985 season of the television melodrama Dallas; she successfully sued the production company for breach of contract when she was abruptly fired upon Bel Geddes' decision to return to the show.

== Early life ==
Reed was born Donna Belle Mullenger in Denison, Iowa, the daughter of Hazel Jane (née Shives) and William Richard Mullenger. The eldest of five children, she was raised as a Methodist. She had two brothers and two sisters. In 1936, while she was a sophomore at Denison High School, her chemistry teacher gave her the book How to Win Friends and Influence People. The book is said to have greatly influenced her life. Upon reading it she won the lead in the school play, was voted Campus Queen and was in the top 10 of the 1938 graduating class.

After graduating from Denison High School, Reed planned to become a teacher but was unable to pay for college. She moved to California to attend Los Angeles City College on her aunt's advice. While attending college, she performed in various stage productions, although she had no plans to become an actress. After receiving several offers to take screen tests for studios, Reed eventually signed with Metro-Goldwyn-Mayer; however, she insisted on finishing her education first. She completed her associate degree, then signed with an agent.

== Career ==
=== Metro-Goldwyn-Mayer ===
In 1941, after signing with Metro-Goldwyn-Mayer, Reed made her film debut in The Get-Away opposite Robert Sterling; she was then billed as Donna Adams.

MGM didn't care for her name and soon changed it to Donna Reed. "A studio publicist hung the name on me, and I never did like it", Reed once said. "I hear 'Donna Reed' and I think of a tall, chic, austere blonde that isn't me. 'Donna Reed' – it has a cold, forbidding sound."

Reed had a supporting role in Shadow of the Thin Man (1941) and in Wallace Beery's The Bugle Sounds (1942). Like many starlets at MGM, she played opposite Mickey Rooney in an Andy Hardy film, in her case the hugely popular The Courtship of Andy Hardy (1942). She was second-billed in the children's film, Mokey (1942). Reed starred in Calling Dr. Gillespie (1942) and Apache Trail (1942), then did a thriller with Edward Arnold, Eyes in the Night (1942), directed by Fred Zinnemann.

Reed appeared in The Human Comedy (1943) with Mickey Rooney, Dr. Gillespie's Criminal Case (1943) and The Man from Down Under (1943). She was one of many MGM stars to make cameos in Thousands Cheer (1943). Her "girl-next-door" good looks and warm onstage personality made her a popular World War II pin-up, and she personally answered letters from American servicemen overseas. She retained some 350 of the letters she was sent during the war. Reed starred in See Here, Private Hargrove (1944) and Gentle Annie (1945), a Western. She was in The Picture of Dorian Gray (1945) and played a nurse in John Ford's They Were Expendable (1945), opposite John Wayne. MGM was very enthusiastic about Reed's prospects at this time.

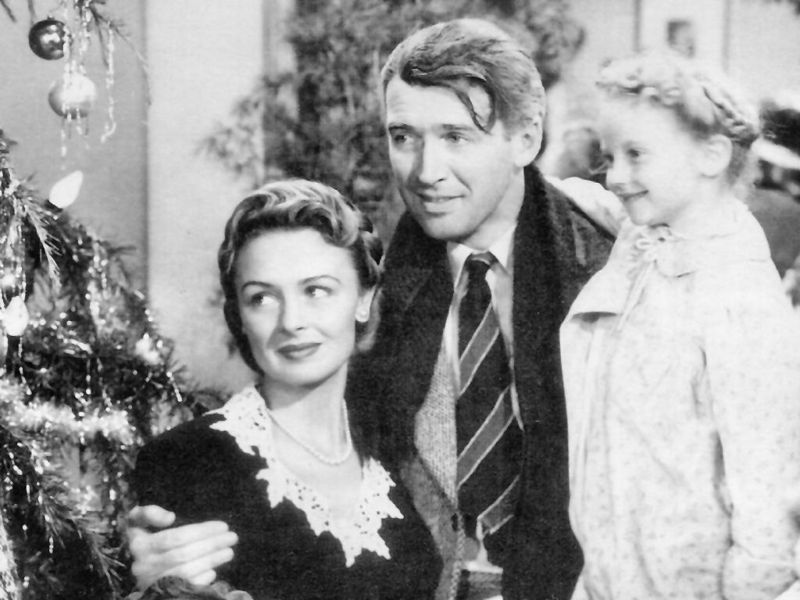
Reed with James Stewart in the classic It's a Wonderful Life (1946)

Reed collaborated with her Denison High School chemistry teacher Edward R. Tompkins (who worked on the Manhattan Project) on the 1947 MGM film The Beginning or the End, which dealt with the history and concerns of the atom bomb. Reed contributed to the story but does not appear in the final film. Reed was top-billed in a romantic comedy Faithful in My Fashion (1946) with Tom Drake.

MGM lent Reed to RKO for the role of Mary Bailey in Frank Capra's It's a Wonderful Life. The film has since been named as one of the 100 best American films ever made by the American Film Institute and is regularly aired on television during the Christmas season. Reed later said it was "the most difficult film I ever did. No director ever demanded as much of me."

Back at MGM, she appeared in Green Dolphin Street (1947) with Lana Turner and Van Heflin, a financial hit.

Paramount borrowed Reed for two films with Alan Ladd, Beyond Glory (1948), where she replaced Joan Caulfield at the last minute, and Chicago Deadline (1949). In 1949, Reed expressed a desire for better roles.

=== Columbia ===
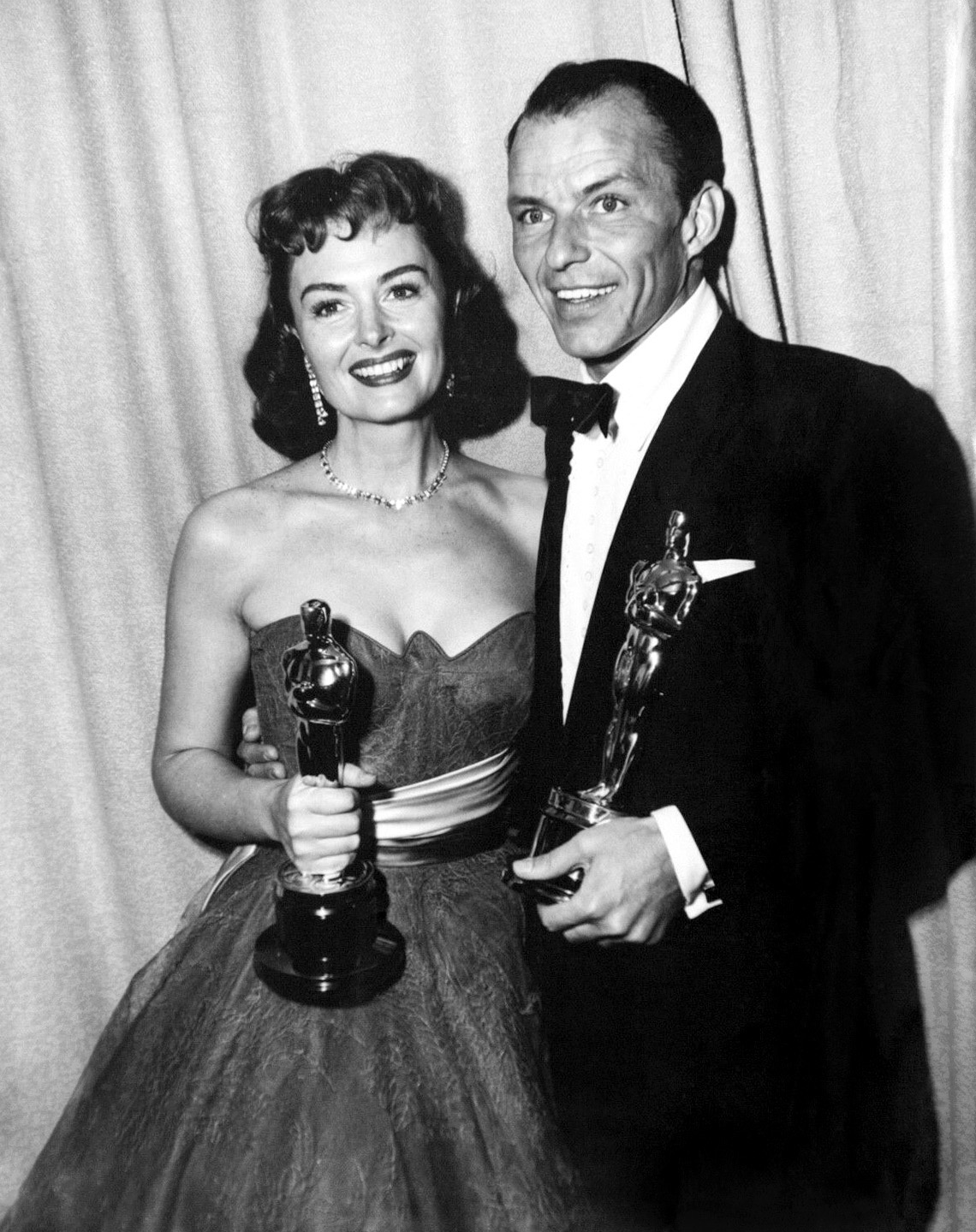
For her performance in From Here to Eternity, Reed (at left, beside co-star Frank Sinatra) received the Academy Award for Best Supporting Actress.

In June 1950 Reed signed a contract with Columbia Studios. She appeared in two films which teamed her with John Derek, Saturday's Hero (1951) and Scandal Sheet (1952). She had a cameo in Rainbow 'Round My Shoulder (1952).

Reed was the love interest of Randolph Scott in Hangman's Knot (1952), then was borrowed by Warner Bros for Trouble Along the Way (1953) with Wayne. She was loaned out to play John Payne's love interest in Edward Small's Raiders of the Seven Seas (1953).

Reed played the role of Alma "Lorene" Burke, girlfriend of Montgomery Clift's character, in the World War II drama From Here to Eternity (1953). The role earned Reed an Academy Award for Best Supporting Actress in 1953.

The qualities of her parts did not seem to improve: she was the love interest in The Caddy (1953) with Martin and Lewis at Paramount; Gun Fury (1953) with Rock Hudson; Three Hours to Kill (1954) with Dana Andrews; and They Rode West (1954) with Robert Francis. Reed returned to MGM to act in The Last Time I Saw Paris (1954).

Reed began guest starring on television shows such as The Ford Television Theatre, Tales of Hans Anderson, General Electric Theater and Suspicion. Reed and her husband Tony Owen set up their own company, Todon, which produced a number of films shot in Britain.

She continued to appear in features, usually as the love interest, in The Far Horizons (1955) at Pine-Thomas Productions with Fred MacMurray and Charlton Heston as Lewis and Clark, playing Native American Sacagawea; The Benny Goodman Story (1956) with Steve Allen at Universal, playing Goodman's wife; Ransom! (1956) at MGM as Glenn Ford's wife; Backlash (1956), a Western at Universal with Richard Widmark; Beyond Mombasa (1957), shot in Kenya with Cornel Wilde, during which she was injured while making the film; and The Whole Truth (1958), shot in England with Stewart Granger for Romulus Pictures.

=== The Donna Reed Show ===
From 1958 to 1966, Reed starred in The Donna Reed Show on ABC, a television series produced by her then-husband, Tony Owen. The show featured her as Donna Stone, the wife of pediatrician Alex Stone (Carl Betz) and mother of Jeff (Paul Petersen) and Mary Stone (Shelley Fabares). Reed was attracted to the idea of being in a comedy, something with which she did not have much experience. She also enjoyed playing the role of a wife.

The show ran for eight seasons on ABC. Reed won a Golden Globe Award and earned four Emmy Award nominations for her work on the series.

Reed described her show as "[...] a realistic picture of small-town life with an often humorous twist. Our plots revolve around the most important thing in America—a loving family." In the show, Reed's character, Donna Stone, is a loving mother and wife, but also a strong, smart woman with feelings and a sense of humor.

Some feminists criticized the show, asserting that it promoted submissiveness among housewives. In a 1979 interview, Reed, who had raised four children, responded, "I played a strong woman who could manage her family. That was offensive to a lot of people."

In a 1984 television interview, Reed said of her show, "I felt that I was making, for women, a statement. This mother was not stupid. She wasn't domineering, but she was bright and I thought rather forward-thinking, happily married."

In a 2008 interview, Paul Petersen, who portrayed her son Jeff Stone in the series, also shared his opinions about the production's significance,

That's what the show was really about, the importance of family. That's where life's lessons are transmitted, generation to generation. There's a certain way in which these are transmitted, with love and affection...[The Donna Reed Show] depicts a better time and place. It has a sort of level of intelligence and professionalism that is sadly lacking in current entertainment products. The messages it sent out were positive and uplifting. The folks you saw were likable, the family was fun, the situations were familiar to people. It provided 22-and-a-half-minutes of moral instruction and advice on how to deal with the little dilemmas of life.

=== Later career ===
When The Donna Reed Show ended its run in 1966, Reed took time off from acting to concentrate on raising her children and engaging in political activism. She returned to acting in the late '70s, appearing in the TV movies The Best Place to Be (1979) and Deadly Lessons (1983), as well as in a guest stint on The Love Boat.

In the 1984–85 season of the TV series Dallas, Reed replaced Barbara Bel Geddes, who left the show due to illness, as Miss Ellie Ewing. Of the show, Reed explained in a 1984 interview,

One of the main reasons Dallas is successful is the family. They all stick together. They may squabble, but they pull for one another and live under one roof, which is really tribal, and it's not true anymore! And I think deep down, everyone misses that.

After Bel Geddes recovered and unexpectedly expressed a desire to return to the role for the 1985–86 season, Reed was abruptly fired. She sued in an attempt to stop the production of Dallas while she negotiated to be reinstated as Miss Ellie. Reed then sued for breach of contract, later settling out of court for over $1 million.

== Personal life ==
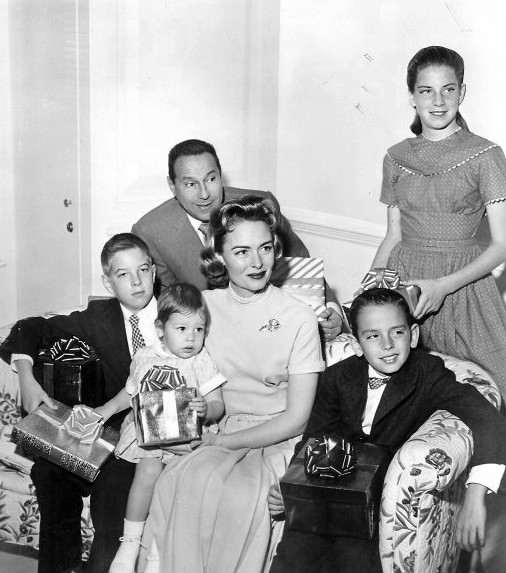
Reed, Tony Owen, and their four children in 1959

From 1943 to 1945, Reed was married to make-up artist William Tuttle. After they divorced in 1945 she married producer Tony Owen. They raised four children together, two of whom were adopted. After 26 years of marriage, Reed and Owen divorced in 1971.

Three years later, Reed married Grover W. Asmus, a retired United States Army colonel. They remained married until her death in 1986.

=== Political views ===
Reed, who was a registered Republican, became interested in politics in particular during the Vietnam War when she became concerned that her adopted son, Tony, might be drafted. In 1967, Reed became a peace activist and co-chaired the anti-war advocacy group, Another Mother for Peace. The group's slogan was "War is not healthy for children and other living things." In a 1971 interview with the Los Angeles Times, Reed said,

In the beginning, we felt [Tony] should serve his country in a noncombatant role. But he wouldn't even accept that, feeling the whole thing was immoral. He didn't trust the government or the military. I've learned a lot from Tony.

Reed supported Barry Goldwater in the 1964 United States presidential election.

In addition to opposing the Vietnam War, Reed also supported Democratic Senator Eugene McCarthy from Minnesota, a strong anti-war advocate, in the 1968 presidential election.

== Death ==
Reed died on January 14, 1986, at age 64, of pancreatic cancer in Beverly Hills, California. She had been diagnosed with the illness three months earlier and was told it was at a terminal stage. Her remains are interred in the Pierce Brothers Westwood Village Memorial Park and Mortuary.

== Legacy ==
In 1987, Reed's widower, Grover Asmus, together with actresses Shelley Fabares and Norma Connolly and other friends and family members, created the Donna Reed Foundation for the Performing Arts. Based in Reed's hometown of Denison, the non-profit organization grants scholarships for performing arts students, runs an annual festival of performing arts workshops, and operates the Donna Reed Center for the Performing Arts.

Denison hosts an annual Donna Reed Festival. Reed's childhood home was located on Donna Reed Drive in Denison but was destroyed by a fire in 1983. Reed bequeathed her Academy Award to her hometown, and it is on display at the William A. McHenry House in Denison.

In May 2010, Turner Classic Movies honored Reed as their star of the month which saw one of her daughters pay a special tribute to her.

In a 2011 article, actress Shelley Fabares (who played Mary Stone on The Donna Reed Show) wrote,

[Donna Reed] definitely became my second mother. She was a role model and remains so to this day. I still periodically hear her voice in my head when I am making a decision about doing something, I hear her urging me on to make the stronger decision of the two. I just adored her.

Fabares also described Reed as "a real Iowa girl. There is a bedrock decency to people in the Midwest. They are thoughtful and ready to help you if something needs to be done. She never lost that Midwest girl."

The state of Iowa announced Donna Reed Day on January 27, 2021, marking the 100th anniversary of her birth.

Reed is portrayed by Sarah Faye Terry in the 2026 biopic Jimmy.

== Radio ==
Year	Title	Role	Notes
1947	Lux Radio Theatre		Episode: It's A Wonderful Life
1948	Lux Radio Theatre		Episode: You Were Meant For Me
1949	Lux Radio Theatre		Episode: High Barbaree
1949	Lux Radio Theatre		Episode: Deep Waters
1951	Lux Radio Theatre		Episode: To Please A Lady
1952	Screen Guild Theater		Episode: The Mating of Millie
1954	Lux Radio Theatre		Episode: The Naked Jungle
1955	Lux Radio Theatre		Episode: Rawhide

== Filmography ==
=== Film ===
Year	Title	Role	Notes
1940	Convicted Woman	Inmate	Uncredited
1941	The Get-Away	Maria Theresa 'Terry' O'Reilly	
1941	Shadow of the Thin Man	Molly	
1941	Babes on Broadway	Jonesy's Secretary	Uncredited
1942	The Bugle Sounds	Sally Hanson	
1942	The Courtship of Andy Hardy	Melodie Eunice Nesbit	
1942	Mokey	Anthea Delano	
1942	Calling Dr. Gillespie	Marcia Bradburn	
1942	Apache Trail	Rosalia Martinez	
1942	Eyes in the Night	Barbara Lawry	
1942	Personalities		Uncredited
1943	The Human Comedy	Bess Macauley	
1943	Dr. Gillespie's Criminal Case	Marcia Bradburn	Alternative title: Crazy to Kill
1943	The Man from Down Under	Mary Wilson	
1943	Thousands Cheer	Customer in Red Skelton Skit	
1944	See Here, Private Hargrove	Carol Holliday	
1944	Gentle Annie	Mary Lingen	
1945	The Picture of Dorian Gray	Gladys Hallward	
1945	They Were Expendable	Lt. Sandy Davyss	
1946	Faithful in My Fashion	Jean Kendrick	
1946	It's a Wonderful Life	Mary Hatch Bailey	
1947	Green Dolphin Street	Marguerite Patourel	
1948	Beyond Glory	Ann Daniels	
1949	Chicago Deadline	Rosita Jean D'Ur	
1951	Saturday's Hero	Melissa	Alternative title: Idols in the Dust
1952	Scandal Sheet	Julie Allison	Alternative title: The Dark Page
1952	Rainbow 'Round My Shoulder	Herself	Uncredited
1952	Hangman's Knot	Molly Hull	
1953	Trouble Along the Way	Alice Singleton	Alternative title: Alma Mater
1953	Raiders of the Seven Seas	Alida	
1953	From Here to Eternity	Alma "Lorene" Burke	Academy Award for Best Supporting Actress
1953	The Caddy	Kathy Taylor	
1953	Gun Fury	Jennifer Ballard	
1954	They Rode West	Laurie MacKaye	
1954	Three Hours to Kill	Laurie Mastin	
1954	The Last Time I Saw Paris	Marion Ellswirth / Matine	
1955	The Far Horizons	Sacagawea	Alternative title: The Untamed West
1956	The Benny Goodman Story	Alice Hammond	
1956	Ransom!	Edith Stannard	Alternative title: Fearful Decision
1956	Backlash	Karyl Orton	
1956	Beyond Mombasa	Ann Wilson	
1958	The Whole Truth	Carol Poulton	
1960	Pepe	Herself (cameo)	

=== Television ===
Year	Title	Role	Notes
1954	Ford Television Theatre	Lydia Campbell	Episode: "Portrait of Lydia"
1955	Tales of Hans Anderson		Episode: "Wee Willie Winkie"
1957	General Electric Theater	Rayna	Episode: "Light from Tormendero"
1957	Suspicion	Letty Jason	Episode: "The Other Side of the Curtain"
1958–1966	The Donna Reed Show	Donna Stone	275 episodes
1979	The Best Place to Be	Sheila Callahan	TV movie
1983	Deadly Lessons	Miss Wade	TV movie
1984	The Love Boat	Polly / Gwen	Episodes: "Polly's Poker Palace" (Parts 1 & 2)
1984–1985	Dallas	Miss Ellie Ewing Farlow	24 episodes (final appearance)

== Awards and nominations ==
Year	Award	Category	Title	Result
1953	Academy Awards	Best Supporting Actress	From Here to Eternity	Won
1964	Bravo Otto	Best Female TV Star	The Donna Reed Show	Nominated
1965	Bravo Otto	Best Female TV Star	The Donna Reed Show	Nominated
1964	Golden Apple Awards	Most Cooperative Actress		Won
1963	Golden Globe Awards	Best TV Star – Female	The Donna Reed Show	Won
2006	Online Film & Television Association	Television Hall of Fame: Acting	The Donna Reed Show	Won
1959	Primetime Emmy Awards	Best Actress in a Leading Role (Continuing Character) in a Comedy Series	The Donna Reed Show	Nominated
1960	Primetime Emmy Awards	Outstanding Performance by an Actress in a Series (Lead or Support)	The Donna Reed Show	Nominated
1961	Primetime Emmy Awards	Outstanding Performance by an Actress in a Series (Lead)	The Donna Reed Show	Nominated
1962	Primetime Emmy Awards	Outstanding Continued Performance by an Actress in a Series (Lead)	The Donna Reed Show	Nominated
2004	TV Land Awards	The Most Irreplaceable Replacement	Dallas	Nominated
2006	TV Land Awards	The Most Irreplaceable Replacement	Dallas	Nominated
