= Jan Fortune (writer) =

American journalist

- Born: Jan Isbell; December 5, 1892; Wellington, Texas, U.S.
- Died: October 2, 1979 (aged 86); Los Angeles, California, U.S.
- Occupation(s): Journalist, screenwriter
- Spouse: Joseph Byrd Fortune

Jan Isbell Fortune (December 5, 1892 – October 2, 1979) was an American journalist, novelist, and screenwriter known for scripting several Western films in the 1930s and 1940s. She also wrote for The Dallas Morning News and The Saturday Evening Post, among other publications, as well as several books.

== Early life ==
Jan Isbell was born on December 5, 1892, in the back of a post office in Wellington, Texas. She was the first girl born in that town. As a child, she liked to write poetry and narrative, and was usually seen with a book. She graduated from Wellington High School in May 1910, in which she was part of the school's first graduating class. She later moved to Dallas with her mother and her sister Lucille. She had multiple jobs before she married her first husband, Joseph Byrd Fortune Jr., and they had four children.

== Career ==
Fortune began working for The Dallas Morning News in 1922. She worked at the newspaper for 15 years before quitting in 1937 and moving to Hollywood to pursue a career in film screenwriting.

"I landed in Los Angeles with $3.87", Fortune told reporters. "I read in a paper that Republic studio was going to make a picture based on the life of Sam Houston. So I went after the job." Upon arriving in Los Angeles, she and her daughter found themselves stealing food to survive. Eventually, she landed a contract with Republic Pictures before starting a career with MGM.

Fortune's work over the years appeared in publications such as The Saturday Evening Post, Good Housekeeping, and Collier's. She also wrote several books after she stopped writing for films, including a book about Bonnie and Clyde. Fortune compiled and edited the memoirs of Emma Kraus Parker, mother of Bonnie Parker, in the 1934 book Fugitives: The true story of Clyde Barrow and Bonnie Parker. She wrote dramatic sketches about the history of Texas, which were broadcast on radio.
