= Small Talk =

Small Talk or variants may refer to:

- Small talk, an informal type of conversation
- Smalltalk, a computer programming language

== Film and television ==
- Small Talk (1929 film), a 1929 Our Gang short comedy film, the first with sound
- Small Talk (2016 film), a 2016 Taiwanese documentary film
- Chhoti Si Baat or Small Talk, a 1975 Hindi romantic comedy film
- Small Talk (British game show), a 1994–1996 show hosted by Ronnie Corbett
  - Small Talk (American game show), a 1996–1997 spinoff of the British show, hosted by Wil Shriner
  - Small Talk (Vietnamese game show), a 2005–2014 spinoff of the British show, hosted by Thanh Bạch

== Music ==
- Small Talk (Sly and the Family Stone album), 1974
- Small Talk (Twenty Twenty album), 2011
- Small Talk (Soda Blonde album), 2021
- Small Talk (Whitney album), 2025
- Small Talk (EP), an EP by MNEK
- "Small Talk", a 2019 song by Katy Perry
- "Small Talk", a 2026 song by Charlie Jeer and Cat Burns
- "Smalltalk", a song by Ultraísta from their eponymous debut album
- "Small Talk", a song from the 1954 musical The Pajama Game
- "Small Talk", a song by Scritti Politti from the 1985 album Cupid & Psyche 85
- "Small Talk", a song by Roxette from the 1991 album Joyride
- "Small Talk", a song by Genesis from the 1997 album Calling All Stations
- "Small Talk", a song by Saving Aimee from the 2009 album We're the Good Guys
- "Small Talk", a song by The Story So Far from the 2013 album What You Don't See
