= Dream Big =

Dream Big may refer to:

== Music ==
- Dream Big (Ryan Shupe & the RubberBand album), or its title track
- Dream Big (Soda Blonde album), 2023
- "Dream Big" (David Cook song), 2008
- "Dream Big" (Jazmine Sullivan song), 2009

== Film and television ==
- "Dream Big", an episode of Season 11 of Barney & Friends
- Dream Big (docuseries), a 2022 football docuseries of Melbourne Victory FC
- Dream Big: Engineering Our World, a 2017 film by MacGillivray Freeman

== See also ==
- DreamBIG Children's Festival in Adelaide, South Australia
