= Reg Grundy Organisation =

Australian television production company

- Type: Subsidiary
- Industry: Media
- Founded: 25 February 1959; 67 years ago as Reg Grundy Enterprises
- Founder: Reg Grundy
- Defunct: 14 November 2006
- Fate: Merged with Crackerjack Productions to form FremantleMedia Australia
- Successor: Fremantle Australia
- Headquarters: Sydney and Melbourne, Australia
- Key people: Mark Fennessy – chief executive officer (CEO); Carl Fennessy – chief operating officer (COO)
- Products: Television production; Distribution; Licensing; Media
- Parent: FremantleMedia (1995–2006)

Reg Grundy Organisation (founded as Reg Grundy Enterprises, later known as both Reg Grundy Productions and Grundy Television and known informally as Grundy's) was an Australian-based multinational mass media company, primarily involved in television as a production company but also in distribution and licensing.

Reg Grundy, the company's namesake founded the media enterprise locally in 1959, It branched out internationally in the late 1980s under the banner Grundy World Wide Limited with divisions in Europe, United Kingdom, the United States and Asia.

The company first produced game shows, then branched into soap operas in 1973. In 1995 Reg Grundy sold the company to British television company Pearson Television. In 2006, Fremantle merged Grundy Television and Crackerjack Productions to form the localised arm Fremantle Australia. Until 2013, the Grundy name still existed internationally in Germany as Grundy Light Entertainment and in Italy as Grundy Productions Italy.

== Company history/foundation ==
Reg Grundy's started his media career in radio, before moving to television producing Wheel of Fortune which launched on Nine Network in 1959. Another show with this title, based on Merv Griffin's American game format, celebrated its 25th anniversary in Australia a week before its cancellation in July 2006. In 1960, the company begin licensing formats, starting with Concentration in 1960. The company begin a relationship with Goodson-Todman Productions where it produced the Australian rights to many of its properties starting with Say When! in 1962, later expanding to properties outside of USA and continental Europe in 1976, later gaining exclusive worldwide rights outside of USA and continental Europe in 1992 such as in the South America, Australia, New Zealand, Southeast Asia and Japan territories as well as others.

In an effort to diversify itself, the company begin expanding beyond game shows to producing documentaries in 1973 and soap operas in 1974, and eventually rebranding to Reg Grundy Organisation in 1977 with Reg Grundy Productions Ltd. acting as a subsidiary.

In the late 1980s, Reg Grundy established Grundy Worldwide Limited. He created and operated local, independent television production and distribution companies in Europe, Asia and North and South America.

Pearson Television (now FremantleMedia Limited) acquired the Grundy group of companies on 3 April 1995. On 30 August 2006, FremantleMedia announced they would merge Grundy Television with their other Australian production company, Crackerjack Productions, to form a single "super" production company called "FremantleMedia Australia", the new company to be managed by Crackerjack's management team with Mark Fennessy as Chief Executive Officer, and his brother Carl Fennessy as Chief Operating Officer.

Simon Spalding, Fremantle's Director of Asia Pacific Operations, said in an interview that Grundy Television's premises in Sydney would be refurbished and that, once complete, all Sydney-based staff would be located there. He claimed that this would help to create a 'deeper' production facility and was not a cost-cutting exercise. Spalding also said that although the Grundy name would be disappearing, he was looking at how FremantleMedia could retain the Grundy name and the heritage associated with it.

== United States ==
Reg Grundy Productions was the American wing of the worldwide television production company Grundy Worldwide, founded by Australian television producer Reg Grundy. The company first started in 1979 with the American launch of the television series Prisoner for Firestone Program Syndication Ltd., before getting into game shows.

Reg Grundy Productions was responsible for the production of two highly successful daytime game shows on NBC during the 1980s, the revival of Sale of the Century and Scrabble, and produced a revival of Scrabble in 1993. The company also produced Time Machine (a history-themed game show similar in format to The Price Is Right) and Scattergories for NBC, Bruce Forsyth's Hot Streak for ABC and Small Talk for The Family Channel. Of the game shows Grundy produced in America, only Sale and the original Scrabble were hits; Time Machine lasted 16 weeks, Bruce Forsyth's Hot Streak, and Small Talk had 13-week runs each and Scattergories and the revival of Scrabble were cancelled after five months (the latter returning only on a limited basis). Frequent announcers of the company's game shows included Jay Stewart, Don Morrow, Gene Wood and Charlie Tuna.

Bill Mason (who was EP of Sale of the Century, Jeopardy! and Wheel of Fortune New Zealand) operated the American-based Grundy operation, and was the executive in charge of production for all of the Grundy-based game shows in the States. Former co-creator of game show Concentration, Robert Noah was also the driving force behind several of the aforementioned game shows, including Time, Sale and Scrabble.

The company also produced re-edited versions of the highly successful soap operas Prisoner and (in some markets) Neighbours.

In the United States, Reg Grundy Productions was headquartered in west Los Angeles, near Century City, and was responsible for launching the career of television and talent agent entrepreneur Sean Perry, whose father Jim Perry, hosted Sale of the Century.

Pearson’s acquisition of the Mark Goodson library would bring its classic game shows such as The Price Is Right and Family Feud under the same umbrella as those of Grundy.

== United Kingdom ==
Reg Grundy Productions opened up a UK branch in 1975 known as "Reg Grundy Productions (G.B.) Limited".

The UK branch begin producing in 1987 and produced two big BBC programmes – Going for Gold and Small Talk. They also produced three cult shows for ITV called Keynotes, Celebrity Squares and Man O Man.

In 1997, Grundy UK began producing a majority of Channel 5's launch programmes, producing shows such as 100%, Whittle, Night Fever, Fort Boyard, Win Beadle's Money, One to Win (a revival of Going for Gold), Greed and The Desert Forges.

In 1999, the existing programmes produced by Pearson Television subsidiary Fremantle (UK) Productions were moved to Grundy UK, which included the two Bruce Forsyth game shows such as Play Your Cards Right and The Price Is Right as well as a Tim Clark game show called Give Us a Clue, a Michael Barrymore game show called Strike It Lucky, a Paul O'Grady game show called Lily Savage's Blankety Blank, a Dale Winton game show called Dale's Supermarket Sweep and Liza Tarbuck's version of Blockbusters.

By 2006, all remaining shows produced under the Grundy name were transitioned off to Talkback Thames.
