= Need U Bad =

Single by Jazmine Sullivan

from the album Fearless
- Released: May 13, 2008
- Recorded: 2007-2008
- Studio: Gold Mine Studios (New York City)
- Genre: Reggae, R&B, soul
- Length: 4:17
- Label: J; Arista
- Songwriters: Jazmine Sullivan; Missy Elliott; Cainon Lamb; Taurian Osbourne; Nicholas Taylor Stanton; Tapper Zukie
- Producers: Missy Elliott; Cainon Lamb

Jazmine Sullivan singles chronology
"Need U Bad" (2008)	"Bust Your Windows" (2008)

Missy Elliott singles chronology
"Shake Your Pom Pom" (2008)	"Need U Bad" (2008)	"Bad Girl" (2008)

"Need U Bad" is a song performed by American singer-songwriter Jazmine Sullivan from her debut album, Fearless (2008). The song features hip-hop rapper Missy Elliott, as well as rapper Pepa of rap duo Salt-N-Pepa speaking a Jamaican chant. "Need U Bad" is Sullivan's debut single and the lead single from Fearless. It was first released on May 13, 2008 in the United States by J and Arista Records. The song was co-written by Sullivan in collaboration with Elliott, Cainon Lamb, and Taurian Osbourne. It was produced by Elliott and Lamb. The song uses a sample from Nicholas Taylor Stanton's "Higher Meditation Riddim Version", and Tapper Zukie's "Papa Big Shirt".

"Need U Bad" was one of two songs on Fearless where Sullivan collaborated with Elliott and Lamb. Musically, the song was inspired to be different from typical mainstream singles. Featuring prominent elements of reggae, R&B and soul music characteristics, the track was composed in a different style to co-relate with the title of its parent album, Fearless. Lyrically, "Need U Bad" takes reference to a situation when one develops a strong need for one's lover.

"Need U Bad" garnered a positive response from contemporary music critics. The single also achieved R&B chart success; peaking at number one on U.S. Billboard Hot R&B/Hip-Hop Songs, and at number 37 on the Billboard Hot 100. It is Sullivan's most successful single on Billboard Hot R&B/Hip-Hop Songs to-date.

"Need U Bad" was accompanied by a music video which was directed by Jonathan Mannion and released on July 8, 2008. The flashback-styled video features Sullivan singing and dancing with Missy Elliott and other reggae musicians in a recording studio. Sullivan performed "Need U Bad" on BET's 106 & Park, along talk shows:The Ellen DeGeneres Show (morning) and The Tonight Show with Jay Leno. "Need U Bad" was nominated in the 'Best Female R&B Vocal Performance' category at the 51st Grammy Awards.

== Background ==
Missy Elliott was one of the people that always let me know that she believed in me and thought I would go far. She has always been there and had my back. We have about 3 albums worth of songs. It’s not even like work.

— Jazmine Sullivan on working with Missy Elliott on "Need U Bad".

After meeting hip-hop rapper and record producer Missy Elliott at the age of 13, Jazmine Sullivan and Elliott begun working on over 30 songs together. During 2006-07, Sullivan spent a year recording a demo tape which included "Need U Bad". The demo tape resulted in Sullivan signing a recording deal with J Records. "Need U Bad" was chosen as Sullivan's debut single and the lead single from Fearless. Sullivan revealed in an interview with music website, Urban Connectionz Online, that it made sense for her to release the song as her first single because of the connection and vibe between Missy Elliott and herself. The song was also chosen because of how different it was to songs on the radio at the time. Sullivan saw releasing a song with a reggae fusion vibe as a risk and that the risk would tie in with its parent album's title, Fearless.

== Reception ==
=== Critical reception ===
Michael Cragg of musicOMH said that "Need U Bad" saw Sullivan "tackling reggae", further saying that the track was a highlight on Fearless and as equally convincing as fellow album highlights "Lions, Tigers & Bears" and "Live a Lie". "Need U Bad" was also seen as an album highlight by Mark Edward Nero of About.com who described the song as a "Caribbean anthem". Andy Kellman from Allmusic deemed the track as "yearning/swaggering". Simon Vozick-Levinson of Entertainment Weekly reviewed the song saying it had been greeted by "a public and critical rush of adulation." Vozick-Levinson went on to say that the "great tune" and "one of the catchiest singles getting airplay at the moment" is "an uncannily Lauryn Hill-y slice of reggaefied soul."

Jeff Harvey of Okayplayer reviewed "Need U Bad" in relation to its similarity to the rest of the tracks on Fearless, saying: "Fans of Sullivan's raw, reggae tinged single [...], may be a little put off by the prestine production and pop sensibilities of much of her album, and indeed, it is far from The Miseducation of Jazmine Sullivan that hungry L-boogie fans may have unfairly hoped for." Joey Guerra of the Houston Chronicle mentioned that "reggae-flavoured" "Need U Bad" is a sample of Sullivan's eclectic musical approach. While Todd Martens from the Los Angeles Times felt that the song sees Sullivan comfortably veering into glossy mainstream territory, saying it slides from easy-listening R&B to a more clubby reggae beat. "Need U Bad" ranked at number eight on VIBE's 'Best Songs of '08' list. The song was nominated in the 'Best Female R&B Vocal Performance' category at the 51st Grammy Awards, losing out to Alicia Keys' "Superwoman".

=== Chart performance ===
In the United States, "Need U Bad" debuted at number 73 on the Billboard Hot 100 on August 2, 2008. The single went on to peak at number 37 and spend 13 weeks on the chart, inevitably becoming her second most successful single on the Hot 100 behind "Bust Your Windows". The single is Sullivan's only number one hit to-date, spending four weeks atop of the Hot R&B/Hip Hop Songs chart, and spending a total of 34 weeks on the chart altogether. "Need U Bad" is also Sullivan's only single to chart on the Pop 100 where it peaked at number 83.

== Music video ==
Sullivan in a scene from the music video, singing into a recording studio microphone.

"Need U Bad" was accompanied by a music video directed by American photographer, Jonathan Mannion and costume-designed by June Ambrose Mannion's previous music video work includes The Game's "It's Okay (One Blood)" (2006), and J. Holiday's "Bed" (2007). The video was shot on June 16, 2008, and later released on July 7, 2008. It features a cameo appearance from Missy Elliott. The video reached BET's 106 & Park top-10 video countdown and also reached number two on AOL Music. It also ranked at number fourteen on BET's 'Notarized 2008' Top 100 video countdown. Urban Review stated that they were really liking the music video. They felt that it adds well to the slightly 'Old School' vibe that the song already has. The blog further noted: "It obviously has broken the bank, but it's not particularly necessary when the song speaks for itself."

== Track listings ==
U.S CD Single

1. "Need U Bad" (Radio Edit) – 4:00
2. "Need U Bad" (No Patois Version) – 3:45
3. "Need U Bad" (Instrumental) – 4:28
4. "Need U Bad" (Call Out Hook) – 0:17

U.S. Digital Download / 7"

1. "Need U Bad" (Album Version) – 4:17

U.S. 12"

1. "Need U Bad" (Main Mix) – 4:12
2. "Need U Bad" (Instrumental Version) – 4:19

UK 7"

1. "Need U Bad" (Main Mix) – 4:12
2. "Need U Bad" (Moody Boyz Remix) – 4:50

== Remix ==
The official remix features Georgia-based rapper T.I., additional vocals by Missy Elliott, and a new verse by Sullivan, the remix is exclusively on the website Rhapsody as a digital download and as a bonus track on the international edition of the album.

== Credits and personnel ==
- Songwriting – Jazmine Sullivan, Missy Elliott, Cainon Lamb, Taurian Osbourne, Nicholas Stanton, Tapper Zukie
- Production – Missy Elliott, Cainon Lamb
- Recording and engineering – Missy Elliott, Paul J. Falcone
- Additional vocals – Pepa, Missy Elliott
- Mixing – Manny Marroquin, Christian Plata

== Charts ==
=== Weekly charts ===
Chart (2008)	Peak position
US Billboard Hot 100	37
US Hot R&B/Hip-Hop Songs (Billboard)	1
US Pop 100 (Billboard)	83

=== Year-end charts ===
Chart (2008)	Position
US Hot R&B/Hip-Hop Songs (Billboard)	7
Chart (2009)	Position
US Hot R&B/Hip-Hop Songs (Billboard)	58

== Certifications ==
Region	Certification	Certified units/sales
United States (RIAA)	Platinum	1,000,000^{‡}
^{‡} Sales+streaming figures based on certification alone.

== Radio and release history ==
=== Radio adds ===
Country	Date	Format
United States	May 25, 2008	Urban
United States	July 6, 2008	Rhythmic
United States	August 17, 2008	Urban AC

=== Release history ===
Country	Date	Format
United States	May 13, 2008	CD single
United States	May 20, 2008	Digital download
United States	May 27, 2008	7"
United States	June 2, 2008	12"
United Kingdom	September 15, 2008	7"

== See also ==
- List of R&B number-one singles of 2008 (U.S.)
