= Small Talk (Soda Blonde album) =

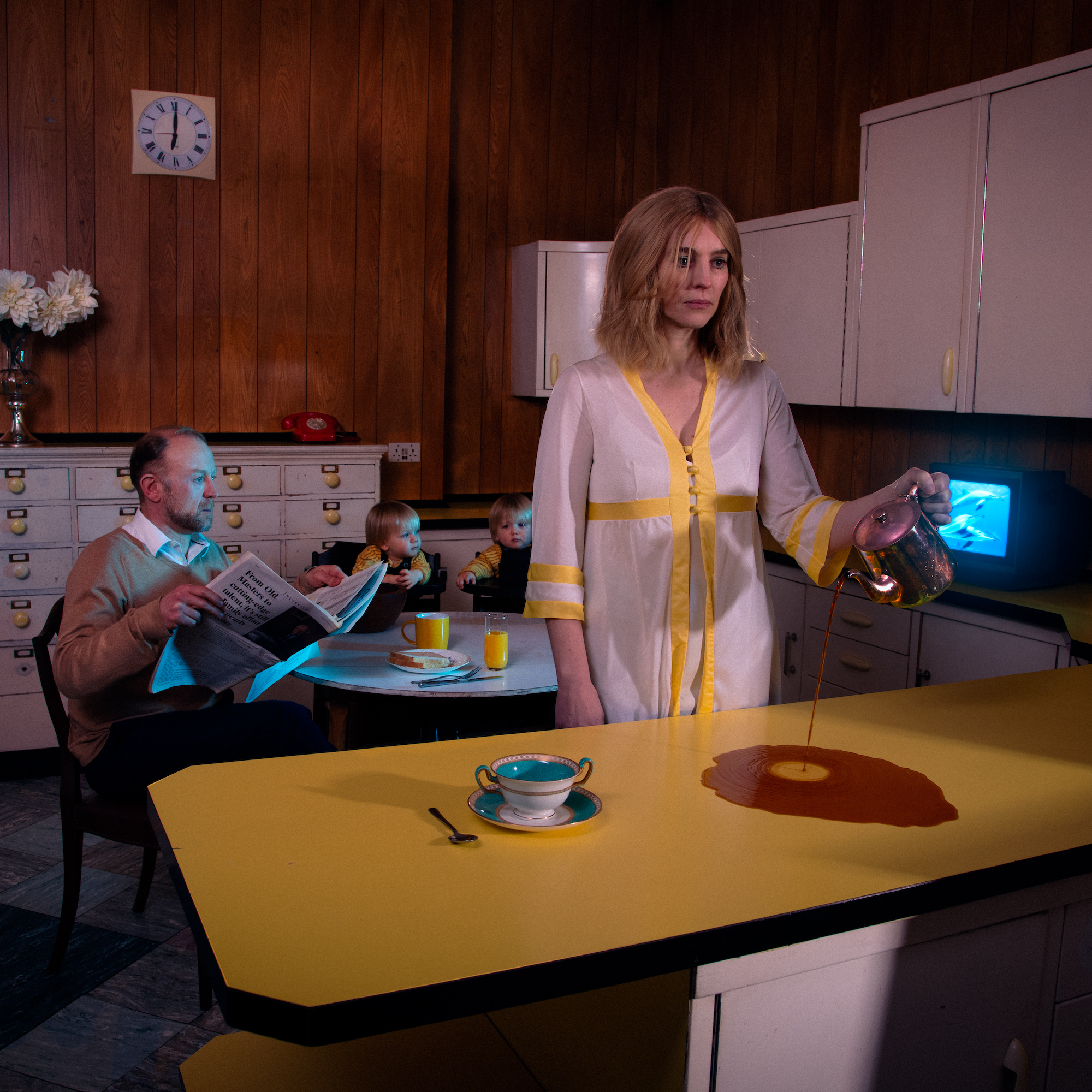

Studio album by Soda Blonde
- Released: July 9, 2021
- Recorded: 2020–2021
- Studios: White Cottage, Killiney Beach, Co. Wicklow, Ireland
- Length: 45:28
- Label: Velveteen Records
- Producer: Soda Blonde

Soda Blonde chronology
Isolation Content (2019)	Small Talk (2021)	Dream Big (2023)

Small Talk is the debut studio album by Irish alternative pop band Soda Blonde, released on 9 July 2021, by Velveteen Records. The album was self-produced by the band, engineered and mixed by guitarist Adam O'Regan.

Following the release of their EPs Terrible Hands and isolation content in 2019, Small Talk was supported by singles "Small Talk" and "In The Heat Of The Night," alongside music videos and tours across Ireland and the UK in 2021 and 2022. The album received positive reviews from critics and was nominated for the Choice Music Prize in 2021.

== Background ==
Soda Blonde emerged in 2019 after the dissolution of Little Green Cars on 21 March 2019, when four members—Faye O'Rourke, Adam O'Regan, Donagh Seaver O'Leary, and Dylan Lynch—decided to form a new band.

== Recording and production ==
Small Talk was recorded at White Cottage, Killiney Beach, County Wicklow, Ireland, between 2020 and 2021. The band took a self-produced approach, with all production handled by Soda Blonde themselves. Adam O'Regan, the band's guitarist, engineered and mixed the album, while Aidan McGovern mastered it at Academy of Sound. Additional production on the track "Holy Roses" was provided by J Smith, and contributions from Dan Smith and Stevie Appleby were included on "Tiny Darkness" and "The Dark Trapese." String arrangements for "Tiny Darkness" and "Choices" were crafted by O'Regan and Aran O'Grady, performed by a quintet and recorded by Ben Rawlins at DIT Conservatory.

== Release and promotion ==
Small Talk was released on 9 July 2021, by Velveteen Records. The lead single, "Small Talk," was released on 4 June 2021, followed by "The Truth" on the album's release date, 9 July 2021. Three music videos—"Swimming Through The Night," "Small Talk," and "In The Heat Of The Night"—were released to promote the album, available on Soda Blonde's YouTube channel. The band supported the release with tours across Ireland and the UK in 2021 and 2022, including performances at Whelan's in Dublin and The Great Escape Festival in Brighton, as announced on their official website.

== Reception ==
The album was nominated for the Choice Music Prize in 2021. Paste Magazine described Small Talk as "a yearning, wistful record, and a criminally underrated 2021 release," rating it 7.9 out of 10. The Irish Times gave it four out of five stars, and stated "So it proves with Small Talk, a record so articulate and expressive that its title has to be a wry in-joke," while Hot Press commented "Everyone else should heed O’Rourke’s advice from amongst those gorgeous strings of ‘Tiny Darkness’ and 'get with the programme' because Small Talk is a big deal."

== Track listing ==
All tracks are written by Soda Blonde.

No.	Title	Length
1.	"Tiny Darkness"	4:02
2.	"The Dark Trapese"	3:21
3.	"In The Heat of the Night"	3:45
4.	"Swimming Through The Night"	3:10
5.	"Terrible Hands"	3:50
6.	"Try"	4:15
7.	"Holy Roses"	3:30
8.	"I Still Have Feelings For You"	3:05
9.	"Small Talk"	4:20
10.	"Champion of my Time"	3:40
11.	"Love Me World"	3:55
12.	"Choices"	4:10
Total length:		45:28

== Personnel ==
Credits adapted from Bandcamp.

=== Soda Blonde ===
- Faye O'Rourke – vocals, guitar
- Adam O'Regan – guitar, bass, piano, synthesiser, vocals
- Donagh Seaver O'Leary – bass, vocals
- Dylan Lynch – drums, percussion, vocals

=== Additional personnel ===
- Production
  - Soda Blonde – production
  - Adam O'Regan – engineering, mixing
  - Aidan McGovern – mastering (at Academy of Sound)
  - J Smith – additional production ("Holy Roses")
- Musicians
  - Dan Smith – additional contributions ("Tiny Darkness," "The Dark Trapese")
  - Stevie Appleby – additional contributions ("Tiny Darkness," "The Dark Trapese")
  - Lucia Mac Partlin – violin ("Tiny Darkness," "Choices")
  - Andrew Sheeran – violin ("Tiny Darkness," "Choices")
  - Philip Keenan – viola ("Tiny Darkness," "Choices")
  - Gabrielė Dikčiūtė – cello ("Tiny Darkness," "Choices")
  - Edward Tapceanu – double bass ("Tiny Darkness," "Choices")
- Technical
  - Adam O'Regan – string arrangements ("Tiny Darkness," "Choices")
  - Aran O'Grady – string arrangements ("Tiny Darkness," "Choices")
  - Ben Rawlins – string recording (at DIT Conservatory)
- Artwork
  - Patricio Cassinoni – photography
  - Soda Blonde – concept, art direction

== Release history ==
Region	Date	Format(s)	Label	Ref.
Various	July 9, 2021	CD; Vinyl; Digital download; Streaming	Velveteen Records	

== Charts ==
Chart performance for Small Talk
Chart (2021)	Peak position
Irish Albums (Official Charts)	27
