= Tom Binns =

British comedian (born 1970)

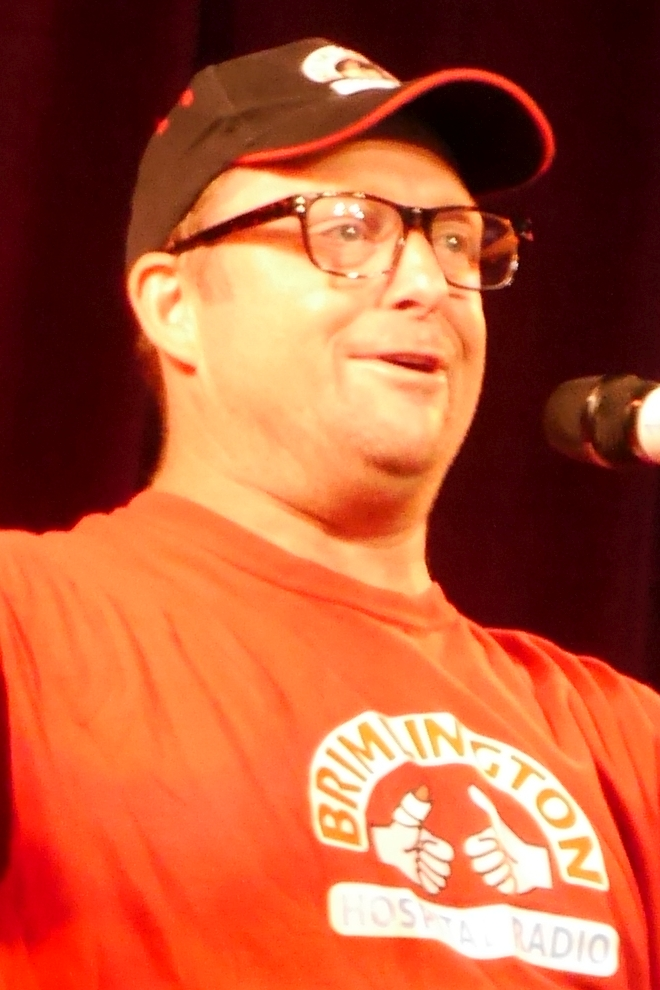
- Binns in 2019
- Born: Christopher Thomas Binns; 1970 (age 55–56); Sheffield, England
- Occupations: Comedian; writer

Christopher Thomas Binns (born 1970) is a British comedian known for his character of Hospital Radio DJ Ivan Brackenbury. In 2023, he was convicted of making and possessing indecent images of children.

== Career ==
He appeared in the BBC MI5 drama Spooks (Episode 6 Series 6), Series 3 of the IT Crowd on Channel 4, in Knowing Me Knowing Yule with Alan Partridge, and, in character as Ivan Brackenbury, on The Jason Byrne Show. In 2017, he appeared in the comedy movie Eaten by Lions.

As Ian D Montfort he had a BBC Radio 2 series called Ian D Montfort is Unbelievable, broadcast in February 2013.

Besides writing comedy for television and radio, Binns has appeared on other television shows, such as RI:SE, Bullrun, Oblivion and as a writer on Trigger Happy TV, for which he earned "best comedy moment" and "TV moment of 2001" awards. His first television appearances were Friday Night Armistice (BBC2) and Lee and Herring's Fist of Fun, and has gone on to further appear in the Channel 4-based late night sports talk show Under the Moon, with Danny Kelly where he regularly referenced his love of Sunderland AFC. He has also had stage appearances at the Bloomsbury Theatre and Garrick Theatre.

Binns has worked on Radio 1, Virgin, BRMB and GLR, Talksport UK, Hallam FM and Key 103, appearing either as himself or as hospital radio character Ivan Brackenbury.

Binns is the co-writer of BBC 1's Hospital People, part of the BBC's Comedy Playhouse, in which he plays the five lead characters Ivan Brackenbury, Ian D Montfort, Susan Mitchell, Terry Boyle and Father Kenny.

He has written the book How to Get Famous – A Cynical Guide.

=== Controversies and criminal conviction ===
In 1999, London-based radio station Xfm was fined £50,000 by the Radio Authority following complaints regarding the use of coarse sexual innuendo when discussing a bestial pornography video with a listener during the Tom Binns Breakfast Show. Parent company Capital Radio decided not to sack Binns but in a meeting shortly after the fine was issued, the Radio Authority made it clear to Capital Radio that this would negatively affect the decision to renew the Xfm licence.

In December 2009, Binns was fired from BRMB by its owners Orion Media after he cut short the Queen's Christmas Message. The Message was played into his show in error instead of the expected two-minute news bulletin. Binns joked, "Two words: bore-ring". He then went on to joke that the British monarchy can't be as good for tourism as some people claim because "the French executed theirs and people still visit France" and played a George Michael record with the link "from one queen to another".

In 2023, Binns was given a ten-month sentence, suspended for fifteen months, after pleading guilty to making indecent images of children and possessing prohibited images. He was also placed on the sex offenders' register for ten years.

== Awards and accolades ==
Binns has received several accolades:

- Best Act award winner at the Midlands Comedy Awards 2015.
