= Give Us a Clue =

British TV game show (1979–1992)

- Genre: Game show
- Created by: Vince Powell; Juliet Grimm
- Presented by: Michael Aspel; Michael Parkinson; Tim Clark
- Starring: Lionel Blair; Una Stubbs; Liza Goddard; Christopher Blake; Julie Peasgood
- Theme music composer: "Chicken Man" by Alan Hawkshaw (1979–81); Denis King (1981–86); Alan Braden (1988–92)
- Country of origin: United Kingdom
- Original language: English
- No. of series: 16 (ITV); 1 (BBC One)
- No. of episodes: 322 (ITV); 30 (BBC One); (list of episodes)

Production
- Running time: 30 minutes
- Production companies: Thames (1979–92); Grundy (1997)

Original release
- Network: ITV
- Release: 2 January 1979 – 4 May 1992
- Network: BBC One
- Release: 10 November – 19 December 1997

Give Us a Clue is a British televised game show version of charades, which was broadcast on ITV from 1979 to 1992. The original host was Michael Aspel from 1979 to 1984, followed by Michael Parkinson from 1984 to 1992. The show featured two teams, one captained by Lionel Blair and the other by Una Stubbs. Later editions of the programme had Liza Goddard as captain of the women's team. Norman Vaughan stood in for Blair for four episodes in the second series, and Joyce Blair stood in for Stubbs for the 1981 Royal Wedding special.

Originally, each team consisted of the captain, two fellow celebrities and one non-celebrity, but the non-celebrity participants were soon dropped, another celebrity being added in their place. In the second episode of Series 2 (broadcast on 5 November 1979), the non-celebrity contestant, London fashion designer Leslie Dean, read the wrong side of the card handed to him and as a result started miming his own name rather than the specified film. In his autobiography, Lionel Blair stated that it was this incident that led to the dropping of non-celebrity participants.

A revived version was broadcast by BBC One in 1997 over 30 episodes, hosted by Tim Clark. Teams were captained by Christopher Blake and Julie Peasgood, and the show introduced a lateral thinking puzzle (which the host could "give clues to"). Give Us a Clue returned for a special Comic Relief episode in March 2011 with Sara Cox, Christopher Biggins, Lionel Blair, Una Stubbs, Holly Walsh, Jenni Falconer and David Walliams.

== Format ==
The game is based on charades, a party game in which players use mime rather than speaking to demonstrate a name, phrase, book, play, film or TV programme. Each player was given roughly two minutes to act out his/her given subject in front of his/her team, and if the others were unsuccessful in guessing correctly, the opposing team would have a chance to answer for a bonus point.

== Episode list ==
=== Series 1 (1979) ===
Episode	First broadcast	Una's team	Lionel's team
1x01	2 January 1979	Liz Fraser; Judy Geeson	Kenneth Williams; David Wilkie
1x02	9 January 1979	Diana Dors; Liza Goddard	Ed Stewart; Colin Baker
1x03	16 January 1979	Miriam Karlin; Wendy Richard	Norman Vaughan; Nicholas Parsons
1x04	23 January 1979	Judy Carne; Tessa Wyatt	Richard O'Sullivan; Peter Jones
1x05	30 January 1979	Joyce Blair; Karen Dotrice	Roy Dotrice; Norman Rossington
1x06	6 February 1979	Libby Morris; Suzanne Danielle	Don Maclean; Tony Selby
1x07	13 February 1979	Barbara Windsor; Jenny Hanley	Jimmy Young; George Layton
1x08	20 February 1979	Gemma Craven; Linda Thorson	Max Wall; Brendan Price
1x09	27 February 1979	Nina Baden-Semper; Françoise Pascal	Kenny Lynch; Bernie Winters
1x10	6 March 1979	Janet Brown; Lynsey de Paul	Peter Butterworth; Derek Griffiths
1x11	13 March 1979	Aimi Macdonald; Judith Chalmers	Alfie Bass; Robin Askwith
1x12	20 March 1979	Julie Rogers; Cheryl Hall	Dickie Davies; Bill Oddie
1x13	27 March 1979	Amanda Barrie; Maureen Lipman	Melvyn Hayes; David Nixon

=== Series 2 (1979–80) ===
Episode	First broadcast	Una's team	Lionel's team
2x01	29 October 1979	Julia McKenzie; Lorraine Chase	Roy Kinnear; George Layton
2x02	5 November 1979	Liza Goddard; Jill Gascoine	Robin Nedwell; George Sewell
2x03	12 November 1979	Lulu; Katie Boyle	Bernie Winters; Jim Davidson
2x04	19 November 1979	Barbara Windsor; Anna Dawson	Alfred Marks; Gareth Hunt
2x05	26 November 1979	Anthea Redfren; Patrica Brake	Graeme Garden; Barry Cryer
2x06	3 December 1979	Shirley Anne Field; Prunella Gee	David Jason; Bob Todd
2x07	10 December 1979	Yootha Joyce; Elizabeth Estensen	Dave Lee Travis; Richard O'Sullivan
2x08	17 December 1979	Faith Brown; Suzanne Danielle	John Junkin; Norman Rossington
2x09	24 December 1979	Paula Wilcox; Clodagh Rodgers; Beryl Reid; Nyree Dawn Porter	Kenneth Williams; Spike Milligan; Russ Abbot; Dickie Davies
2x10	31 December 1979	Libby Morris; Fenella Fielding	Graham Dene; Roy Hudd
2x11	7 January 1980	Liz Fraser; Juliet Hammond-Hill	Warren Mitchell; Kenny Everett
2x12	14 January 1980	Angela Richards; Linda Bellingham	Nicky Henson; Derek Waring
2x13	21 January 1980	Judy Geeson; Linda Haydn	Jimmy Jewel; Norman Eshley
2x14	28 January 1980	June Whitfield; Georgina Hale	Daniel Abineri; Dick Emery
2x15	4 February 1980	Dinah Sheridan; Stacy Dorning	Christopher Beeny; Patrick Cargill
2x16	11 February 1980	Sheila Steafel; Barbara Murray	Lance Percival; Pete Murray

=== Series 3 (1980) ===
Episode	First broadcast	Una's team	Lionel's team
3x01	25 August 1980	Nerys Hughes; Yootha Joyce; Moira Lister	John Conteh; Wayne Sleep; Bernie Winters
3x02	1 September 1980	Maureen Lipman; Susan Stranks; Barbara Windsor	Windsor Davies; Melvyn Hayes; Mick McManus
3x03	8 September 1980	Jan Hunt; Annie Ross; Josephine Tewson	Jimmy Logan; Kenny Lynch; Pete Murray
3x04	15 September 1980	Barbara Kelly; Beryl Reid; Madeline Smith	Bernard Braden; Roy Kinnear; Andrew Sachs
3x05	22 September 1980	Floella Benjamin; Shirley Anne Field; Dilys Watling	Peter Blake; Francis Matthews; Tony Selby
3x06	29 September 1980	Maria Charles; Liz Fraser; Cyd Hayman	Christopher Biggins; Kenny Everett; Shaw Taylor
3x07	6 October 1980	Lynda Baron; Sally James; Jenny Lee-Wright	Dickie Davies; Alvin Stardust; Jack Douglas
3x08	13 October 1980	Jenny Hanley; Nyree Dawn Porter; Janet Street-Porter	Barry Cryer; Gareth Hunt; Bernie Winters
3x09	20 October 1980	Anita Harris; Libby Morris; Hilary Pritchard	Arthur English; Don Maclean; Nicholas Parsons
3x10	27 October 1980	Joyce Blair; Irene Handl; Karen Kay	Jimmy Jewel; Bobby Moore; Robin Nedwell
3x11	3 November 1980	Diana Coupland; Cheryl Kennedy; Sheila Steafel	Rodney Bewes; Norman Rossington; Simon Williams
3x12	10 November 1980	Paddie O'Neil; Liza Goddard; Ann Sidney	Roy Kinnear; Alfred Marks; Victor Spinetti
3x13	17 November 1980	Rachael Heyhoe Flint; Julia McKenzie; Sheila White	Ray Alan; Billy Dainty; David Hamilton
3x14	24 November 1980	Gabrielle Drake; Jean Rook; Barbara Windsor	Derek Fowlds; Harry Fowler; Bernie Winters
3x15	1 December 1980	Yootha Joyce; Amanda Barrie; Muriel Odunton	Tim Barrett; Robert Lindsay; Victor Spinetti
3x16	8 December 1980	Sandra Dickinson; Jill Gascoine; June Whitfield	Jim Davidson; Derek Griffiths; George Sewell
3x17	15 December 1980	Patricia Brake; Anna Dawson; Miriam Karlin	Ian Lavender; Geoff Love; Wayne Sleep
3x18	24 December 1980	Barbara Windsor; Mollie Sugden; Julia Mackenzie	Jim Davidson; Kenny Everett; Alfred Marks
3x19	29 December 1980	Janet Brown; Katie Boyle; Suzanne Danielle	Christopher Biggins; Bryan Marshall; Hugh Paddick

=== Royal Wedding Special (1981) ===
Episode	First broadcast	Joyce's team	Lionel's team
Sp.	29 July 1981	Anna Dawson; Ruth Madoc; Sandra Dickinson	Brian Murphy; Derek Griffiths; Roy Kinnear

=== Series 4 (1981–82) ===
Episode	First broadcast	Una's team	Lionel's team
4x01	1 September 1981	Michele Dotrice; Lucinda Prior-Palmer; Jill Gascoine	Rolf Harris; Glenn Hoddle; Edward Woodward
4x02	8 September 1981	Faith Brown; Rula Lenska; Claire Rayner	Roy Kinnear; Robin Nedwell; Duncan Goodhew
4x03	15 September 1981	Pam Ayres; Gabrielle Drake; Donna Hartley	Geoff Capes; Paul Eddington; Kenny Everett
4x04	22 September 1981	Sandra Dickinson; Lesley Judd; Beryl Reid	Peter Davison; Geoffrey Hayes; Jon Pertwee
4x05	29 September 1981	Anna Quayle; Susan Penhaligon; Sharron Davies	John Inman; Alex Higgins; Victor Spinetti
4x06	6 October 1981	Maureen Lipman; Maria Charles; Jenny Hanley	Kenneth Williams; Griff Rhys-Jones; Shaw Taylor
4x07	13 October 1981	Lynsey de Paul; Molly Parkin; Anna Dawson	Andrews Sachs; Christopher Biggins; John L. Gardner
4x08	3 November 1981	Jackie Collins; Angela Rippon; Jenny Lee-Wright	Henry Cooper; Windsor Davies; Bernie Winters
4x09	10 November 1981	Sally James; Annie Ross; Madeleine Smith	Denis King; Ian Lavender; Henry McGee
4x10	17 November 1981	Jenny Lee-Wright; Suzi Quatro; June Whitfield	Nigel Davenport; David Jacobs; Tom O'Connor
4x11	24 November 1981	Cheryl Kennedy; Madge Hindle; Victoria Burgoyne	Rodney Bewes; Barry Mason; Brian Marshall
4x12	1 December 1981	Susan Anton; Beryl Reid; Debbie Linden	Dudley Moore; Jimmy Jewel; Simon Williams
4x13	24 December 1981	Pat Coombs; Stacy Dorning; Joanna Van Gyseghem	Terry Scott; Joe Brown; Nicholas Lyndhurst
4x14	31 December 1981	Mollie Sugden; Patricia Brake; Nanette Newman	Kenneth Williams; Gareth Hunt; Lonnie Donegan
4x15	5 January 1982	Katie Boyle; Angela Douglas; Lyn Paul	Dudley Moore; Harry H. Corbett; Brian Cant
4x16	6 April 1982	Suzanne Danielle; Bonnie Langford; Julia McKenzie	Roy Kinnear; Pete Murray; Shaw Taylor
4x17	13 April 1982	Liz Fraser; Victoria Wood; Denise Nolan	Richard O'Sullivan; Wayne Sleep; Lance Percival
4x18	20 April 1982	Judith Chalmers; Leslie Ash; Nerys Hughes	Nicky Henson; Kenny Ball; Justin Fashanu

=== Series 5 (1982) ===
Episode	First broadcast	Una's team	Lionel's team
5x01	4 May 1982	Honor Blackman; Lorraine Chase; Angela Douglas	Michael Barrymore; Danny la Rue; George Sewell
5x02	11 May 1982	Maureen Lipman; Anna Dawson; Debbie Arnold	Kenneth Williams; Bernard Bresslaw; Mike Berry
5x03	18 May 1982	Sylvia Syms; Joanne Whalley; Barbara Windsor	Christopher Biggins; Martin Jarvis; Spike Milligan
5x04	7 September 1982	Julia McKenzie; Patricia Hayes; Suzanne Dando	Edward Woodward; Mike Reid; Robin Cousins
5x05	14 September 1982	Sheila White; Jenny Linden; Su Pollard	Nigel Davenport; Lennie Bennett; Ray Alan
5x06	21 September 1982	Ruth Madoc; Isla Blair; Avril Angers	Rolf Harris; Christopher Timothy; Vince Hill
5x07	28 September 1982	Gemma Craven; Susan Hanson; Bonnie Langford	Kenneth Williams; Frazer Hines; Norman Collier
5x08	5 October 1982	Lorraine Chase; Claire Rayner; Annie Ross	Marty Feldman; Martin Jarvis; Felix Bowness
5x09	12 October 1982	Carol White; Dana; Joyce Blair	Geoffrey Bayldon; Roy Castle; Glyn Houston
5x10	19 October 1982	Shirley Anne Field; Sue Lloyd; Libby Morris	Bernie Winters; Jeffrey Holland; Simon Cadell
5x11	26 October 1982	Patricia Brake; Lorna Dallas; Anna Quayle	Jon Pertwee; Christopher Timothy; David Janson
5x12	2 November 1982	The Beverley Sisters	The Bachelors
5x13	9 November 1982	Anna Dawson; Suzanne Danielle; Jenny Lee-Wright	Derek Griffiths; Roy Kinnear; Freddie Starr
5x14	16 November 1982	Angela Douglas; Barbara Murray; Tracey Ullman	David Jacobs; John Inman; Brian Jacks
5x15	23 November 1982	Susan Penhaligon; Sabina Franklyn; Julia McKenzie	Barry Cryer; William Franklyn; Duggie Brown
5x16	30 November 1982	Leslie Ash; Lucinda Green; Dilys Watling	Rolf Harris; Tom O'Connor; Shaw Taylor
5x17	21 December 1982	Carol Drinkwater; Hazel O'Connor; Victoria Wood	Leslie Crowther; Michael Barrymore; The Great Soprendo
5x18	26 December 1982	Susannah York; Elaine Paige; Suzanne Dando	Freddie Starr; Patrick Mower; Christopher Biggins

=== Series 6 (1983–84) ===
Episode	First broadcast	Una's team	Lionel's team
6x01	6 September 1983	Cheryl Baker; Anna Quayle; Gillian Raine	Leonard Rossiter; Terry Scott; David Jensen
6x02	13 September 1983	Dawn Addams; Anneka Rice; Paula Wilcox	Ian Ogilvy; Richard Murdoch; Roy Kinnear
6x03	20 September 1983	Leslie Ash; Honor Blackman; Angela Rippon	Wayne Sleep; Hank Marvin; Jeffrey Holland
6x04	27 September 1983	Joyce Blair; Madeline Smith; Anne Diamond	Graeme Garden; Jim Davidson; Bill Beaumont
6x05	4 October 1983	Prunella Gee; Judy Geeson; Gloria Hunniford	Christopher Timothy; Don Maclean; Hubert Gregg
6x06	18 October 1983	Lynda Baron; Ruth Madoc; Deborah Watling	Kenneth Williams; Mark Wynter; Derek Waring
6x07	25 October 1983	Anna Dawson; Stephanie Lawrence; Gayle Hunnicutt	Bernie Winters; Freddie Trueman; Joe Brown
6x08	1 November 1983	Julia McKenzie; Maureen Lipman; Stephanie Beacham	Michael Bentine; Barry Cryer; David Kernan
6x09	8 November 1983	Rosalind Ayres; Isla St Clair; Paula Yates	Martin Jarvis; Billy Dainty; Tommy Boyd
6x10	15 November 1983	Su Pollard; Julie Walters; Tessa Wyatt	Richard O'Sullivan; Alan Minter; Stubby Kaye
6x11	29 November 1983	Pam Ayres; Jenny Lee-Wright; Carol Drinkwater	Lance Percival; Charlie Drake; William Franklyn
6x12	6 December 1983	Bonnie Langford; Sonia Lannaman; June Whitfield	Mike Read; Brian Murphy; Malcolm Macdonald
6x13	13 December 1983	Debbie Arnold; Suzi Quatro; Annie Ross	Derek Griffiths; Michael Craig; Jess Conrad
6x14	20 December 1983	Angela Rippon; Victoria Wood; Sylvia Syms	Gerald Harper; Stu Francis; Leslie Crowther
6x15	26 December 1983	Jane Asher; Tracey Ullman; Jilly Cooper	Bob Geldof; Russell Grant; Tim Brooke-Taylor
6x16	2 January 1984	Elspet Gray; Karen Kay; Iris Williams	Brian Rix; John Junkin; Christopher Biggins
6x17	13 March 1984	Joyce Blair; Patricia Hayes; Judy Loe	Frank Carson; Windsor Davies; Richard Stilgoe
6x18	27 March 1984	Katie Boyle; Michele Dotrice; Diane Solomon	Vidal Sassoon; William Rushton; Aiden J. Harvey
6x19	10 April 1984	Janet Brown; Sheila Ferguson; Fiona Fullerton	Peter Gordeno; Gareth Hunt; Freddie Starr
6x20	17 April 1984	Faith Brown; Angela Douglas; Aimi Macdonald	Henry McGee; Acker Bilk; Lennie Bennett

== Transmissions ==
Series	Start date	End date	Episodes
1	2 January 1979	27 March 1979	13
2	29 October 1979	11 February 1980	16
3	25 August 1980	29 December 1980	19
Special	29 July 1981		1
4	1 September 1981	20 April 1982	18
5	4 May 1982	26 December 1982	18
6	6 September 1983	17 April 1984	20
7	4 September 1984	1 January 1985	16
8	28 May 1985	2 July 1985	6
9	12 September 1985	26 December 1985	15
10	3 July 1986	21 August 1986	8
11	4 January 1988	18 March 1988	55
12	1 November 1988	2 December 1988	20
13	14 February 1989	10 March 1989	16
14	5 December 1989	19 January 1990	16
15	15 January 1991	8 March 1991	32
16	3 September 1991	4 May 1992	33
17	10 November 1997	19 December 1997	30

== DVD release ==
The first six series of Give Us a Clue have been released on DVD by Network, but only 98 out of the first 105 episodes were included. The seven episodes that are not in the collection had appearances of three celebrities with sexual abuse offences that were investigated in Operation Yewtree.

DVD title	Discs	Year	Episodes	Release date
Give Us a Clue	13	1979–1984	98	28 November 2022

== International versions ==
Country	Local name	Host	Team captains	Network	Year aired
Netherlands	Hints	Frank Kramer (1983–97); Anita Witzier (1997–2003); Sofie van den Enk (2010–11)	-	KRO	1983–2003; 2010–11
New Zealand	Give Us a Clue	Les Thompson (1980-1981); Brian Edwards (1993-94); Marcus Lush (1999); Paula Bennett (2021–22)	Peter Rowley, Jenny Maxwell (1980-1981); Gary McCormick, Belinda Todd (1993-94); Gary McCormick, Alison Wall (1999); Hilary Barry, Tom Sainsbury (2021–22)	Television Two (1980-1981); TV3 (1993); TVNZ (1999; 2021–22)	16 September 1980 – 2 September 1981; 31 May 1993 – 3 February 1994; 1999; 11 August 2021 – 17 August 2022
Spain	Dame una pista	Luján Argüelles	-	Cuatro	13 July 2010 – 7 January 2011
Sweden	Gäster med gester	Lennart Swahn (1982–99); Rickard Olsson (2011–12)	-	SVT	8 September 1982 – 5 January 1999; 2011–12
