= Absolute Zero (Little Green Cars album) =

Studio album by Little Green Cars
- Released: March 26, 2013
- Recorded: April 2012
- Studios: Angelic Studios, Northamptonshire, England
- Genres: Indie rock, indie folk, Americana
- Length: 47:36
- Label: Glassnote Records
- Producer: Markus Dravs

Little Green Cars chronology
Absolute Zero (2013)	Ephemera (2016)

Absolute Zero is the debut country and folk pop studio album made by Irish indie rock band Little Green Cars which was released in 2013, through Glassnote Records.

== Lyrical themes ==
The tracks featured in the album contains themes including youthful longing, love, and loss. The title from the song was inspired by a quote from Charles Bukowski, likely from his book Screams From the Balcony. Lead singer, Stevie Appleby, describes the song as a contrasting perspective between reckless youth and the fear and confusion of adulthood.

== Critical reception ==
Killian Fox from The Guardian describes the vocals from the album as "heartfelt" and results in a "thrilling immediacy".

== Commercial performance ==
In Ireland, Absolute Zero debuted at number one on the Irish Albums Chart. In the United Kingdom, the album peaked at number 94 on the Official Albums Chart.

== Track listing ==
1. "Harper Lee" – 3:31
2. "Angel Owl" – 3:43
3. "My Love Took Me Down to the River to Silence Me" – 5:00
4. "The Consequences of Not Sleeping" – 3:10
5. "Big Red Dragon" – 4:04
6. "Red and Blue" – 3:56
7. "The Kitchen Floor" – 5:29
8. "The John Wayne" – 4:54
9. "Please" – 4:12
10. "Them" – 4:34
11. "Goodbye Blue Monday" – 5:03

== Personnel ==
- Stevie Appleby – vocals, guitar
- Faye O'Rourke – vocals, guitar
- Adam O'Regan – guitar, vocals
- Donagh Seaver O'Leary – bass, vocals
- Dylan Lynch – drums, vocals

Additional personnel

- Markus Dravs – production
- Robin Baynton – engineering
- Tom Fuller – assistant engineering
- Slater Design – design
- Nick Shymansky – A&R
- Daniel Glass – A&R
