= Tim Clark (comedian) =

British comedian, writer and presenter

- Born: Birmingham, England
- Occupation(s): Comedian, writer, presenter, actor
- Spouse: Married (June 2004)
- Children: 4

Tim Clark is a British comedian, writer and presenter on both television and radio. He currently lives in London with his wife and two of his children.

== Comedy & Stage ==
For more than 30 years, Clark has been building a reputation for himself on the comedy scene. Working as a stand-up comedian and compère, he has performed throughout the U.K., Europe and Asia.

In January 1990, he introduced the first 'Pillar Talk' show at the Pillar Room in the Cheltenham Town Hall, a venue which has seen some of the top acts in the UK including Simon Pegg, Mark Lamarr, Bill Bailey and Frank Skinner. Clark was on hand to witness one of the crazier moments in Jim Jefferies' career. The Australian comic was on stage at the Comedy Store, Manchester when he was attacked by a heckler. As well as touring with Frank Skinner, Clark has toured extensively throughout Europe (including Kosovo and Bosnia) and in Asia. In 1995, he became the first western comic to perform in Beijing, China. He has been a regular act/compère for comedy clubs such as Comedy Store and Jongleurs.

At the 2002 Edinburgh Fringe, Clark performed his one-man drama, "Talking to Ted". Playing the role of a less than stellar comedian he tries to come to terms with his cocaine habit and how he's going to explain to his wife about the Welsh mistress which has now given him a son. His only companion he can talk to is the teddy bear his daughter left in the car. Fiona Stuges reviewed the show in The Independent praising Clark as "a revelation. He has a strong feel for human frailty and performs with acute intelligence. For that, he shouldn't be overlooked.". The show was broadcast on 7 July 2004 on BBC Radio 4 with Les Dennis taking up the main role.

He later returned to Edinburgh in 2006 with the Fringe First production of What I Heard About Iraq. Based on the Eliot Weinberger article and using direct quotes and statistics from the people and events that surrounded the war on Iraq, each member of the production take turns to say 'What I heard about Iraq'. Clark gave a 'powerful performance' and the reviewer ended by saying the play 'is likely to become one of the Fringe's most talked about shows, and rightly so'.

Then in 2014 his play “Gagging For It” was performed at Edinburgh Fringe. 'In a dressing room at the festival four stand-up comics give as good as they get in a riot of one-liners, some at the expense of the disillusioned promoter and others at the expense of an enthusiastic novice. But when a glamorous TV researcher arrives, we find that all is not quite what it seems. In this fast-moving, irreverent and gag-packed new comedy, everything is up for grabs as naked ambition takes centre stage and many a dark truth is revealed‘. The play starred Imran Yusuf, Jonny Freeman, Martyn Hill, Matt Welcome, Becky Graham and Susan Murray. It was directed by Dave Bourn (Perrier Nominated Director).

In 2018 he was a finalist in the “British Comedian Of The Year” competition that offered the biggest prize in stand-up comedy which had over 700 entrants.

Tim has also performed as tour support. Most recently he opened for Engelbert Humperdinck (singer).

== TV & Radio ==
Alongside Danny Kelly, Clark co-hosted a sports phone-in show on Channel 4 called Under the Moon. Starting on 12 Feb 1997, it was aired in the early hours of the morning.

When the BBC tried to revive the show Give Us a Clue (originally on rival network ITV), Clark was called on to host the show. The format of the show basically followed the games of charades with one member of the team miming in order to convey to the rest of the team a popular phrase, book, TV or film. If their team was unable to guess it was passed over to the other team who could steal the points. The teams were captained by Christopher Blake and Julie Peasgood. It was broadcast in the afternoon it ran from 10 November until 19 December 1997 before being axed.

He has probably gained the most national recognition from his television advert for the airline Virgin Atlantic. Appearing alongside actor Paul Blackthorne, Clark played the role of the Grim Reaper. Despite a costume and make-up which took several hours to applying, he was still recognised on the streets.

As well as TV, there have been a couple of short film roles. Clark starred alongside Nina Pasale in Graeme Cole's Pilot for a 22nd Century Sitcom. Clark plays a scientist whose wife has stopped doing the house work fearing an impending nuclear war. He also had a brief appearance in the 2006 short film "The Bed Guy" in the guise of Santa.

Clark has also made guest appearances on radio including six times on BBC Radio 5 Live's "Fighting Talk". He was also a regular guest on the show “Tragedy Plus Time” on Talkradio which was hosted by Bob Mills (comedian).

== Writing ==
As part of Channel 4' Sitcom Festival in 1995, Clark wrote the play The Beautiful Game. The 30-minute piece about two football fans was written for television but performed in front of a live audience at the Riverside Studios, London. His writing career also includes speeches written for ex-England football manager Graham Taylor, ex-footballer Neil Ruddock and also Prime Minister Gordon Brown.
