= Under the Moon =

- Starring: Danny Kelly (1997–98); Tim Clark (1997); Tom Binns (1997–98); Lisa Rogers (1998)
- Country of origin: United Kingdom
- Original language: English

Production
- Running time: 180 minutes

Original release
- Network: Channel 4
- Release: 1997

Under the Moon was an offbeat, late-night 1990s sports show on the United Kingdom's Channel 4. The show was originally hosted by Danny Kelly and comedian Tim Clark. The pair lasted for 10 episodes before Clark left to be replaced by another comedian, Tom Binns.

Binns was axed from the show after he offered to "give Michael Owen one up the arse" after he scored an impressive goal in the 1998 World Cup. He was replaced by Lisa Rogers but the show was cancelled later that year.

The show consisted of sports guests, live phone calls from viewers, comedy from Binns, music, and reports — all connected to sport. Although a sports show, after the main show had ended, Kelly would later act as an in-vision host providing links to the next programme and were thus listed as part of the show. Examples of these were repeats of the now defunct Channel 4 GamesMaster which ran between 1992–1998.

Regular guests included Martin Johnson and Roger Black.
