= Alex Clark (journalist) =

British literary journalist and editor

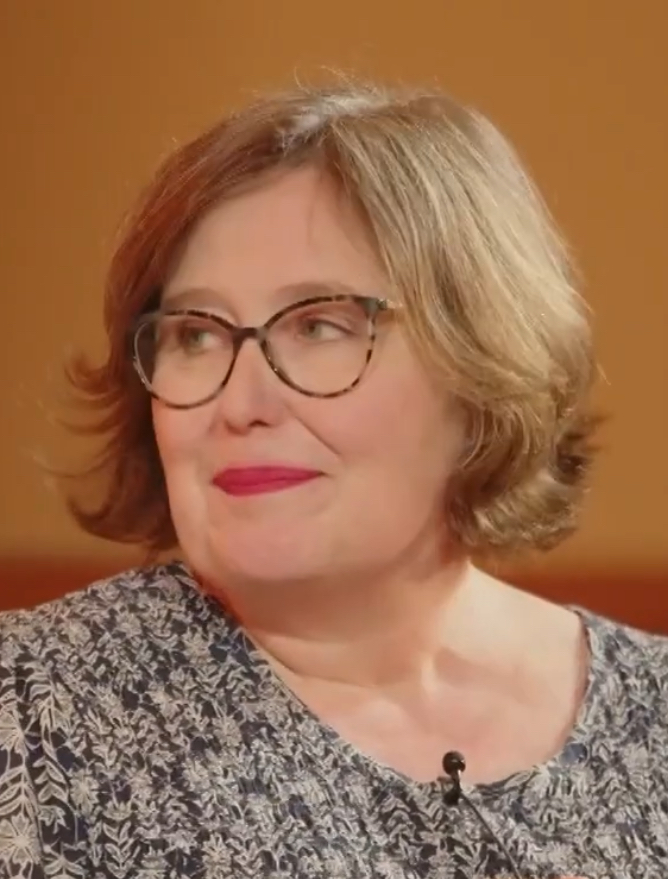
- Clark at the British Library in 2023
- Occupations: Journalist and editor
- Spouse(s): Danny Kelly (m. 2021; died 2026)

Alex Clark is an English literary journalist and editor who has written for The Guardian, The Observer and The Times Literary Supplement. She also presents the programme Front Row on BBC Radio 4 and hosts the Vintage Podcast about books.

Clark is Editor at Large at Union Books. Having previously served as deputy editor, she was appointed as the first female editor of Granta magazine in May 2008, in succession to Jason Cowley. Clark assumed the post in the following September, but left in May 2009. She was succeeded by John Freeman.

== Literary judge ==
Clark was a member of the panel of judges for Granta's Best of Young British Novelists 2003. She has judged many other literary prizes, including the 2008 Man Booker Prize and the Encore Award for best second novel and she is on the advisory committee of the Folio Prize.
