= Bust Your Windows =

Single by Jazmine Sullivan

from the album Fearless
- Released: September 16, 2008
- Genre: R&B; orchestral pop; hip hop
- Length: 4:26
- Label: J; Arista
- Songwriters: Jazmine Sullivan; Salaam Remi; DeAndre Way
- Producer: Salaam Remi

Jazmine Sullivan singles chronology
"Need U Bad" (2008)	"Bust Your Windows" (2008)	"Lions, Tigers & Bears" (2008)

"Bust Your Windows" is a song recorded by American singer Jazmine Sullivan. It was written by Sullivan and Salaam Remi for her debut studio album Fearless (2008), while production was helmed by the latter. The song uses a sample from Remi's "Bad Man Waltz" and interpolates a lyric from American rapper Soulja Boy Tell Em's 2007 single "Crank That (Soulja Boy)." Due to the sample, Soulja Boy is also credited as a songwriter.

Released as the second single from Fearless, "Bust Your Windows" was made available as a digital download on Amazon on September 16, 2008, followed by a physical release on November 15, 2008. It became a top five hit on the US Hot R&B/Hip-Hop Songs chart and was nominated in the Best R&B Song category for 2009's Grammy Awards. Rolling Stone magazine ranked it 58th on its list of the 100 Best Songs of 2008. The song also was listed at number 137 on National Public Radio's list of The 200 Greatest Songs By 21st Century Women.

== Background ==
"Bust Your Windows" was written by Jazmine Sullivan along with Salaam Remi for her debut studio album Fearless (2008). Production was helmed by the latter. The song uses a sample from Remi's "Bad Man Waltz." It also interpolates the lyric "Now watch me you" from rapper Soulja Boy Tell 'Em's 2007 song "Crank That (Soulja Boy)." When asked about her inspiration for the song and if she had ever busted the windows of a boyfriend or ex-boyfriend in real life, Sullivan replied: "We're just not gonna get into that. But, it definitely is a real situation, and I've run into a lot of men and women who've experienced that. It needed to be said, and I was the chick to do it. All you guys have to do is be honest, be faithful, and your windows won't get busted out."

== Composition ==
"Bust Your Windows" is set in common time with a moderate tempo of 107 beats per minute and is written in the key of F harmonic minor. It follows the chord progression Fm–D♭–B♭m–C. Sullivan's vocal range spans from F_{3} to E♭_{5}.

== Critical reception ==
"Bust Your Windows" earned largely favorable reviews. Billboard gave it a positive review, describing Sullivan's performance as "one of the most challenging vocals from a female R&B artist this year. Sullivan's husky voice floats effortlessly over an eerie underlining violin score, originating from a sample of producer Salaam Remi's composition "Bad Man Waltz." Slant Magazine also reviewed the song favorably: "Sullivan exposes the reality beneath the revenge fantasy: "Oh, but why am I the one who's still crying?"

Jon Caramanica, writing for The New York Times noted that "Bust Your Windows" had Sullivan expressing "her feelings with the appropriate tool, a crowbar. "I bust the windows out your car/though it didn't mend my broken heart" she sings, over Hitchcockesque strings and a buoyant hip-hop beat [...] It's a stellar revenge tune, as sassy and unexpected as Carrie Underwood's "Before He Cheats," and an indicator that unlike most soul divas, Ms. Sullivan cuts her misery with a dash of whimsy." Jeff Ihaza from Rolling Stone magazine called the song a "timeless revenge fantasy."

== Commercial performance ==
Released as the second single from Fearless, "Bust Your Windows" was made available as a digital download on Amazon on September 16, 2008, followed by a physical release on November 15, 2008. Fueled by strong radio airplay, it managed to peak at number four on Billboard''s Hot R&B/Hip-Hop Songs chart, becoming her second consecutive top five hit on that chart." "Bust Your Windows" also debuted at number 81 on the Billboard Hot 100 issued for week 43 of 2008. It became her second consecutive top 40 hit on the chart and spent a total of 5 weeks within the top 40, eventually peaking at number 31. The success of the song on this chart continued for weeks on end and it eventually dropped out in early 2009, spending a total of 15 weeks charting. Elsewhere, "Bust Your Windows" became Sullivan's second consecutive top 20 hit on the Billboard Hot 100 Airplay chart as well as her second consecutive top 30 hit on the Billboard Hot Adult R&B Songs chart, peaking at number 18 and number 22, respevtively. Towards the end of the single's promotion, Jazmine performed "Bust Your Windows" on CBS's The Late Late Show in January 2009.

== Music video ==
A music video for "Bust Your Windows" was directed by Chris Robinson. On October 10, 2008, the music video for "Bust Your Windows" premiered on BET's 106 & Park. The video was also placed at 46th on BET's "Notarized: Top 100 Videos of 2008" countdown.

The visuals feature scenes of adultery involving Sullivan's boyfriend in the video mimicking the song and song lyrics. The video, however, does not feature Sullivan physically busting out car windows, as fans expected but instead the intense emotion of the song is displayed through Sullivan breaking wine glasses on a table; there is also a trail of glass leading up to the bedroom where she discovered what would bring out this feeling of rage within her.

The setting of the video is dark and features harsh coloured gases passing through the air whilst Sullivan is singing – adding the sense of anger and depression that the video is meant to bring out in the song. Other scenes feature her boyfriend's guilty conscience of what he's done – namely when he hesitantly looks himself in the mirror.

== Covers and remixes ==
- On September 16, 2009, Fox featured "Bust Your Windows" in their new early fall hit Glee. The show's teenage love triangle leads Mercedes (Amber Riley) to break into her own dream-state music video singing Sullivan's 2008 hit. The song is also featured on the soundtrack album Glee: The Music, Volume 1. The Independent's Andy Gill praised Riley's rendition of "Bust Your Windows", calling it the album's "most compelling moment".
- Trey Songz has covered this song, releasing the underground track as a response from the male antagonist in the original song by Sullivan.
- The official remix features The-Dream. This remix is also featured on the 12" Vinyl release of the song in the U.S.
- Skillz has made a remix, which contains additional vocals by Sullivan (though is not the official remix).
- Chamillionaire has also produced a freestyle called "Car Windows" which features Chalie Boy.
- Jim Jones, Busta Rhymes and Gorilla Zoe have made remixes to the song.
- Ace Hood has also recorded a freestyle over this song.
- In 2011, Jesy Nelson of Little Mix sang the song for her audition for The X Factor (UK).
- The song was also featured in the movie Step Up 3D. The song was covered by a contestant on The Voice UK in May 2013 and caused the song to enter the charts for the first time.
- Chris Hollins and Ola Jordan performed an Argentine tango to the song in the semi-final of the seventh series of Strictly Come Dancing. They went on to win the competition.
- In Mo Seok, Jo Hwanji, and Soko performed a trio arrangement of the song in Phantom Singer 3 Episode 9. It was released in the album Phantom Singer3 Episode.7.
- SZN4 performed an arrangement for Netflix show Building the Band on episode 9 season 1

== Track listing ==
UK single
No.	Title	Writer(s)	Producer(s)	Length
1.	"Bust Your Windows"	Jazmine Sullivan; Salaam Remi; DeAndre Way	Remi	4:26
2.	"Bust Your Windows" (UK Funky Remix featuring Gracious K & DJ Naughty)	Sullivan; Remi; Way	Remi; DJ Naughty^{[a]}	6:39
3.	"Bust Your Windows" (featuring Mz. Bratt)	Sullivan; Remi; Way; Cleopatra Humphrey	Remi	4:44

CD single
No.	Title	Writer(s)	Producer(s)	Length
1.	"Bust Your Windows" (Main mix)	Sullivan; Remi; Way	Remi	3:43
2.	"Need You Bad" (Remix featuring T.I.)	Sullivan; Melissa Elliott; Cainon Lamb; Taurian Osbourne; Nicholas Taylor Stanton; David Sinclair; Clifford Harris, Jr.	Missy Elliott; Lamb^{[a]}	3:49

Notes

- ^{^[a]} denotes additional producer(s)

== Credits ==
Credits adapted from the album's liner notes.

- Stephen Coleman – orchestral arrangement
- Ron Feuer – instruments
- Vincent Henry – instruments
- Jazmine Sullivan – vocalist, writer
- Salaam Remi – instruments, producer, writer
- DeAndre Way – writer (sample)

== Charts ==
=== Weekly charts ===
Weekly chart performance for "Bust Your Windows"
Chart (2008–09)	Peak position
Japan (Japan Hot 100)	8
New Zealand Urban (RMNZ)	15
UK Singles (Official Charts)	63
UK Hip Hop/R&B (Official Charts)	15
US Billboard Hot 100	31
US Adult R&B Songs (Billboard)	22
US Hot R&B/Hip-Hop Songs (Billboard)	4

=== Year-end charts ===
2008 year-end chart performance for "Bust Your Windows"
Chart (2008)	Peak position
US Hot R&B/Hip-Hop Songs (Billboard)	73

2009 year-end chart performance for "Bust Your Windows"
Chart (2009)	Peak position
US Hot R&B/Hip-Hop Songs (Billboard)	55

== Certifications ==
Certifications for "Bust Your Windows"
Region	Certification	Certified units/sales
New Zealand (RMNZ)	Platinum	30,000^{‡}
United Kingdom (BPI)	Silver	200,000^{‡}
United States (RIAA)	Platinum	1,000,000^{‡}
^{‡} Sales+streaming figures based on certification alone.

== Release history ==
Release dates and formats for "Just Right for Me"
Region	Date	Format	Label
United States	September 16, 2008	Digital	J Records; Puppy Love; Arista Records
United States	November 15, 2008	12" Vinyl	J Records; Puppy Love; Arista Records
