= Mareile Höppner =

German television presenter and journalist (born 1977)

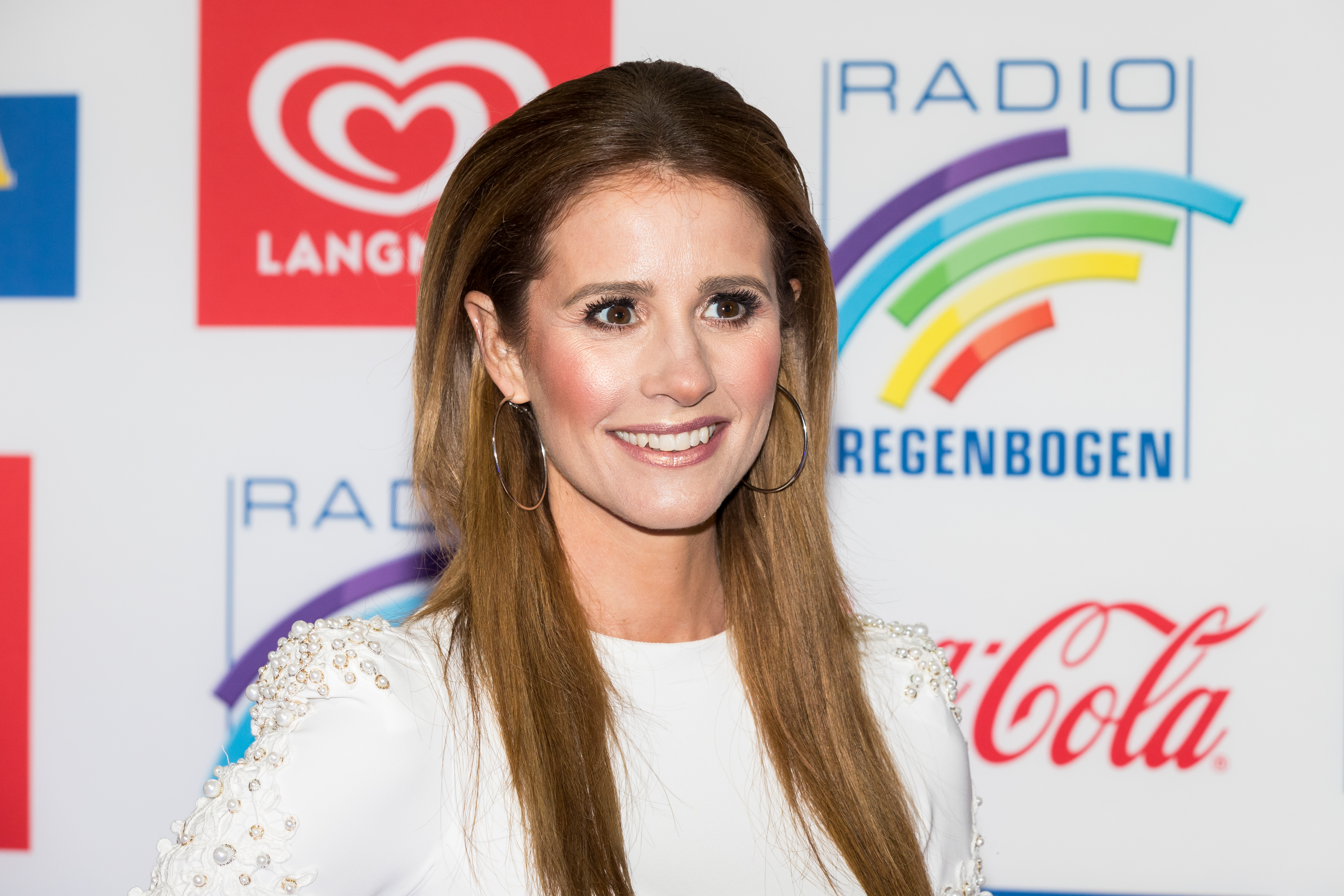
- Höppner in 2018
- Born: 12 May 1977 (age 49); Hamburg, West Germany
- Education: University of Kiel
- Occupations: Television presenter; Journalist
- Years active: 2002-present
- Spouse: Arne Schönfeld (m. 2006)
- Children: 1

Mareile Höppner (born 12 May 1977) is a German television presenter and journalist.

== Life ==
Born in Hamburg, Höppner is the daughter of two schoolteachers and grew up in Lübeck. She gained her Abitur from a high school called the Johanneum in Lübeck then attended the University of Kiel, training for a teaching career in German and the Protestant religion. She left before finishing her course to work for the traffic and weather team at Radio NORA and soon after that became a reporter at RTL Nord in Kiel. For two years she was the weather presenter for Guten Abend RTL, then in 2002 moved across to become the show's main presenter.

From 2004 to 2006, Höppner presented Newstime on ProSieben with Michael Marx and in 2006 hosted the grand final of the first season of Verliebt in Berlin. From 2006 to 2007 she fronted Sat.1 am Mittag on Sat.1 and from 2007 to 2008, worked on Das Sat.1 magazine. From 2009 to 2012, she hosted the Mitteldeutscher Rundfunk talk show Riverboat. Since 2008 she has moderated the magazine Brisant, and since 2018 has been the main presenter of a game show on Das Erste, Dingsda, the German version of Child's Play. In 2019, she appeared on the game show Hätten Sie's gewusst? as an expert on Prince Harry.

== Private life ==
In 2006 Höppner married her long-time boyfriend Arne Schönfeld, a product manager at Bosch. In November 2010, they had a son. In October 2019, she announced that she had separated from her husband two years before.

== Publications ==
- Was kommt nach der Queen? Das englische Königshaus zwischen Boulevard und Buckingham Palace (Hamburg: Rowohlt Reinbek, 2018), ISBN 978-3-499-63372-0
