= Child's Play (game show) =

- Created by: Mark Goodson
- Directed by: Ira Skutch
- Presented by: Bill Cullen
- Announcer: Gene Wood, Johnny Gilbert, Bob Hilton
- Theme music composer: Score Productions
- Country of origin: United States
- No. of episodes: 258

Production
- Executive producers: Chester Feldman; Jonathan Goodson
- Producer: Mimi O'Brien
- Production locations: CBS Television City; Hollywood, California
- Camera setup: Multi-camera
- Running time: 22–24 minutes
- Production company: Mark Goodson Productions

Original release
- Network: CBS
- Release: September 20, 1982 – September 16, 1983

Child's Play is an American television game show in which adult contestants tried to guess words based on definitions given by children. The Mark Goodson-produced series debuted on CBS on September 20, 1982, and ended on September 16, 1983.

This was the first game show created and produced solely by Mark Goodson after the death of his longtime business partner Bill Todman in 1979; all subsequent shows made by Goodson (including the existing Goodson-Todman programs that were still airing at the time) were credited as "A Mark Goodson Television Production", with a new logo reflecting the company's name change.

== Hosts and announcers ==
Child's Play was hosted by game show veteran Bill Cullen. This was both Cullen's final game on CBS and his last for Mark Goodson, ending a 30-year association with the Goodson company as an emcee. Gene Wood was the primary announcer for the entire run, with Johnny Gilbert and Bob Hilton (who also announced on the pilot) filling in on occasion.

Cullen first plugged the show during his only appearance on Bob Barker's version of The Price Is Right on October 26, 1982.

== Main game ==
Two contestants competed. The object of the game was to correctly identify words based on videotaped definitions given by elementary school-age children (ages 5–9). The game was played in two rounds.

=== Round 1 ===
In the first round, a word was given to the home audience, and a video clip of a child defining that word was played (e.g. a child stating "it's something you use to unlock a door to a house or a car" to define "key"). If the child said the word or any form of it, or any other words that were judged unsuitable for broadcast, the audio was bleeped out and an oval marked "OOPS" was superimposed over the child's mouth to prevent the contestants from trying to guess the word through lip reading.

Once the clip ended, the contestant had a chance to guess the word; a correct response earned one point. If the contestant was incorrect, a clip of another child defining the same word was played and the opponent could offer a guess. A miss resulted in a third clip being played and gave the first contestant one last chance to guess. If the contestant was still wrong, no points were awarded.

The champion had initial control for the first word, and control alternated between the two contestants on each new word until the round ended at the second commercial break. Originally, the contestant who guessed each word won control for the next one.

=== Round 2: Fast Play ===
A video clip of a child defining a word was played, and either contestant could buzz in at any time to stop the playback and guess the word. A correct guess awarded two points, while an incorrect guess or failure to respond allowed the opponent to see the rest of the clip before offering a guess. The round continued until a school bell rang, whereupon the contestant in the lead won $500 and advanced to the bonus round. If the game ended in a tie, one additional word was played to determine the winner.

In the first three episodes, Fast Play was played in two halves, each of which ended at the bell. Correct answers were worth one point each in the first half, and two points in the second; in addition, if a contestant guessed incorrectly, the entire clip was played for the opponent.

== Bonus round ==
Two different bonus round formats were used, each with a $5,000 top prize and a 45-second time limit.

Champions returned until they were defeated, had played five bonus rounds, or reached the $25,000 winnings limit in force for CBS game shows at the time.

=== Format 1: Triple Play ===
The champion attempted to guess words based on definitions written by three children, identified only as A, B, or C. Once the champion selected a child, the corresponding definition would be displayed on a screen and read aloud by Cullen, after which he/she could either guess or select again. An incorrect guess allowed him/her to select another definition if any were still available. If the champion was unable to identify the word after hearing all three definitions, it was discarded and play continued with a new word.

The champion won $5,000 for guessing all six words before time ran out, or $100 per correct guess otherwise.

=== Format 2: Turnabout ===
This format replaced Triple Play starting with the April 25, 1983 episode. Five of the children who had appeared in the film clips used during the main game joined the champion onstage, and the champion had to describe seven words for them to guess, addressing one child at a time in sequence. Words were displayed for the home audience. Each correct answer from any child won $100 for the champion, plus $100 to be split equally among the children. The champion could pass on a word and return to it if time permitted; an illegal clue, such as saying the word or any form of it, eliminated that word from play.

If the children guessed all seven words before time ran out, the bonus round winnings for them and the champion were respectively increased to $1,000 and $5,000.

== Broadcast history ==
Child's Play premiered at 10:30 a.m. EST on September 20, 1982 (immediately following The New $25,000 Pyramid, which debuted the same day), replacing reruns of Alice (which had held the timeslot since June 2, 1980 as a result of the cancellation of Whew!). Child's Play faced off against the NBC game shows Wheel of Fortune and, beginning in January 1983, Sale of the Century. However, it was not able to make any ratings headway against either of those shows. As a result, in the summer of 1983, CBS canceled Child's Play; its final episode aired on September 16 of that year. The following Monday, the show's timeslot would be filled by Press Your Luck, which would perform much better for CBS against Sale of the Century and would consequently remain in the 10:30 a.m. timeslot until January 1986.

== Episode status ==
The series is intact, and has been seen on GSN at various times. The show has also aired on Buzzr.

== Notable contestants ==
Several celebrities appeared on Child's Play before they became famous: Suzan Stadner aka Hanala Sagal (actress/writer), Jeff Cohen, Breckin Meyer, Masi Oka, Tara Reid and Adam Richman were all featured children on the show. In addition, Anne-Marie Johnson appeared as a contestant. Also, Sugar Ray Robinson appeared in the audience of the July 4, 1983 episode, and Bill Cullen introduced him as the boxing coach of one of the Child's Play kids participating in the Turnabout game.

== International versions ==
Country	Local name	Host	Channel	Year aired
Australia	Child's Play	Jeff Phillips	Seven Network	1984
Germany	Dingsda	Fritz Egner; Werner Schimidbauer	Bayerisches Rundfunk	1985–1994; 1994–2000
Germany	Dingsda	Thomas Ohner	kabel eins	2001–2002
Germany	Dingsda	Mareile Höppner	Das Erste	2018–2019
Greece	Τα παiδíα παíζεi Ta paidía paízei	Lefteris Eleftheriadis	ERT2	1987–1988
Greece	Τα παiδíα παíζεi Ta paidía paízei	Isabella Vlassiadou	ANT1	1998
Indonesia	Kata Si Kecil	Kepra	antv	1996–1998
Indonesia	Celoteh Anak	Dewi Hughes	Indosiar	2002–2005
Indonesia	Apa.. Apa.. Apa??	Harsya Subandrio	antv	2010–2011
Kazakhstan	Балалы үй - базар Balal’ uj - bazar	Rahman Omarov	NTK	2013
Netherlands	't Is Kinderspel	Fred van de Graaf	NCRV	1984
Netherlands	Dinges	Martine Bijl (1986–1988); Frank Masmeijer (1989–1993); Jo de Poorter (1995)	NCRV	1986–1993; 1995
Poland	Do trzech razy sztuka	Maria Szabłowska; Jerzy Kryszak; Andrzej Zaorski	TVP2	1988–1994
Russia	Устами младенца Ustamy mladentsa	Alexander Gurevich	RTR; NTV	1992–1996, 1999–2000; 1997–1998
Russia	Устами младенца Ustamy mladentsa	Maxim Vitorgan	Disney Channel	2013–2014
Russia	Устами младенца Ustamy mladentsa	Alexey Kortnev (2016–2017); Aleksander Oleshko (2017–2018)	NTV	2016–2018
Russia	Устами младенца Ustamy mladentsa	Olga Shelest (2020); Evgeniy Rybov (2020–2022)	Russia 1	2020–2022
Spain	Juego de niños	Amparo Soler Leal (1988); Tina Sainz (1989); Ignacio Salas (1989–1990); Javier Sardà (1991–1992, 2019)	La 1	1988–1992; 2019
Sweden	Lekande lätt	Kjell Lönnå; Erik Nyberg	Sveriges Television	1987–2001; 2002–2003
Ukraine	Еники-Беники; Eniki-Beniki	Bohdan Beniuk	STB	2007–2009
United Kingdom	Child's Play	Michael Aspel	ITV	1984–1988
United States (Spanish)	Dame la pista	Alessandra Rosaldo	TeleFutura	2008

=== Australia ===
Australia ran their version for a brief period in 1984, hosted by former pop star and host of Happening '71 and '72 Jeff Phillips.

=== Germany ===
Germany ran their successful version of Child's Play under the name Dingsda ("Gizmo/Whatsit") on Bayerischer Rundfunk from 1985–2000 with Fritz Egner from 1985–1994, followed by Werner Schmidbauer from 1994–2000. Then a year later, a revival of the show ran on kabel eins with Thomas Ohrner for a brief period from 2001–2002. Sixteen years later, the show has now been remade for Das Erste with Mareile Höppner since 2018.

=== Greece ===
Their short-lived version titled Tα παiδíα παíζεi (Children Play) originally ran on ERT2 from 1987–1988 with Lefteris Eleftheriadis as host. Ten years later, its revival ran on ANT1 for a brief period in 1998 hosted by Isabella Vlassiadou.

=== Indonesia ===
The Indonesian version of Child's Play ran from 1996–1998 on antv under the name Kata Si Kecil ("The Little's Says"), hosted by Kepra. In 2001-2005, the Indonesian version of Ronnie Corbett's Small Talk had made, under the name Celoteh Anak, which hosted by Dewi Hughes. Then back to the "host of the show", antv again revival this shows with a new concept and atmosphere with the name Apa..?? Apa..?? Apa..?? ("What...?? What...?? What...???") with host Harsya Subandrio from 2010 to 2011.

=== Netherlands ===
Netherlands had two different versions of Child's Play running on NCRV, the first version was called 't Is Kinderspel ("It's Child's Play") running for a brief period in 1984 hosted by Fred van de Graaf. One year later, the show was revived under the new name of Dinges ("Whatchamacallit") which had a much more successful run than its precursor from 1986 to 1995. the original host was Martine Bijl from 1986 to 1988 followed by Frank Masmeijer from 1989 to 1993. Its third and final host of the series was Jo de Poorter (of Familieraad fame) in 1995.

=== Russia ===
Уcтaми млaденцa (Mouths of Babes/Baby Lips) hosted by Alexander Gurevich originally ran from 1992 to 1996 and 1999–2000 on RTR and on NTV from 1997 to 1998. Thirteen years later, the show had a short-lived revival on Disney Channel Russia hosted by Maxim Vitorgan in 2013–2014. Two years later, the series was revived again on channel NTV now hosted by Alexey Kortnev from 2016 until 2017 then he was later replaced by Alexander Oleshko from 2017 until 2018. In 2020, the series was revived on Russia-1, hosted by Olga Shelest who was later replaced by Evgeniy Rybov since season 2.

It was one of the first game shows officially licensed in Russia.

=== Spain ===
Their version is called Juego de niños ("Child's Play") running on TVE from 1988 to 1992. unlike previous international versions, when a contestant guesses a word correctly he or she earns a "Gallifantes" (a puppet like creature) and at the end of the show, whoever gets the most "Gallifantes'" was the winner of the day also unlike the other previous international versions, this one in particular had four host the first host was Amparo Soler Leal from 1988 then he was replaced by Tina Sainz from 1989 then Ignacio Salas from 1989 to 1990 and finally, Javier Sardá from 1991 to 1992 and on 2019.

=== Sweden ===
Their version is called Lekande lätt ("Swimmingly/Light as") aired on Sveriges Television from 1987 to 2001, hosted by Kjell Lönnå then from 2002 until 2003 hosted by Erik Nyberg.

=== Spanish (US) ===
On September 15, 2008, FremantleMedia, owners of the Goodson-Todman catalog of games, revived Child's Play in the Spanish-speaking market as Dame la pista ("Give Me a Clue"), hosted by Alessandra Rosaldo on Univision-owned TeleFutura. This show was the lead-in to ¿Qué dice la gente?, a Spanish-language version of Family Feud, during its run. The show was eventually cancelled alongside its lead in show after less than four months.

=== United Kingdom ===
see under:

the long-running 1984-1988 British version, hosted by Michael Aspel. Clips from this version were seen in the 1985 special called TV's Funniest Game Show Moments #2.
