= Fearless (Jazmine Sullivan album) =

Studio album by Jazmine Sullivan
- Released: September 23, 2008
- Recorded: 2007–2008
- Genres: R&B, dance-pop, hip hop, gospel, orchestral pop.
- Length: 47:53
- Labels: J; Arista
- Producers: Anthony Bell; Cainon Lamb; Carvin & Ivan; DJ Dirty Harry; Fisticuffs; Jack Splash; Jazmine Sullivan; Missy Elliott; Salaam Remi; StarGate

Jazmine Sullivan chronology
Fearless (2008)	Love Me Back (2010)

Alternative cover
- International cover

Singles from Fearless
- 1. "Need U Bad" Released: May 13, 2008; 2. "Bust Your Windows" Released: September 16, 2008; 3. "Lions, Tigers & Bears" Released: November 11, 2008; 4. "Dream Big" Released: February 9, 2009

Fearless is the debut studio album by American singer-songwriter Jazmine Sullivan. It was released on September 23, 2008, through J Records. Production for the album took place during 2007 to 2008 and was handled by several record producers, including Missy Elliott, Stargate, Carvin & Ivan, Wyclef Jean, Jack Splash and Salaam Remi.

The album debuted at number six on the US Billboard 200 chart, selling 65,000 copies in its first week. It also produced three singles that attained respectable charting on Billboard's Hot 100 chart. Upon its release, Fearless received generally positive reviews from most music critics who complimented its production and Sullivan's vocals, comparing her to female R&B artists such as Alicia Keys and Lauryn Hill. The album earned Sullivan seven Grammy Award nominations and has sold 517,000 copies in the United States, having since been certified platinum by the Recording Industry Association of America (RIAA) for exceeded sales of one million units.

== Background ==
Sullivan signed to Jive Records in 2003 where she later began providing vocals for other artists such as Kindred the Family Soul. Sullivan graduated from the Philadelphia High School for the Creative and Performing Arts in Philadelphia in 2005, where she was a vocal music major. After graduation, she was dropped from her record label Jive Records, later scrapping her original debut album which remains unreleased. In 2007, Peter Edge, record executive and then president of J Records, saw interest in her after listening to her demo that she recorded for Christina Milian's single "Say I" (2006), he later which offered her a deal with J Records. She eventually began work for her debut studio album.

The lead single, "Need U Bad", produced by Missy Elliott, was released on May 13, 2008. and its music video premiered on July 7, 2008. The song reached number thirty-seven on the Billboard Hot 100 and number one on the Hot R&B/Hip-Hop Songs chart. She later performed the song at the 2008 BET Awards. "Bust Your Windows" was released as the second single from the album on September 16, 2008, and its music video premiered in October 2008. It reached number 31 on the Hot 100 and serves as Sullivan's most successful single. It also reached number four on the Hot R&B/Hip-Hop Songs, becoming her second top-ten hit on that chart. Two other singles "Lions, Tigers & Bears" (which reached number 74 on the Hot 100) and "Dream Big" were later released and were accompanied by music videos.

In a September 2008 interview with Pete Lewis of Blues & Soul, Sullivan disccused the album's title and lyrical themes,

I named the album 'Fearless' because I'm just not afraid of ANYTHING right now. I'm young, I'm 22 years old... And I just feel that, if YOU embrace your uniqueness by not being afraid to take chances and being different, then everybody ELSE will! You know, I definitely did not wanna exclude ANYBODY! So, if you buy my record and think you're gonna get just a bunch of reggae beats or just a bunch of R&B beats, you'll be wrong! You're gonna get EVERYTHING! I mean, the genres can range from jazz, to gospel, to pop... Because that's who I AM! And, with me having been inspired by so much, I wanted everybody to SEE that diversity in me.

== Critical reception ==
Professional ratings
Review scores
Source	Rating
About.com	3.5/5 stars
AllMusic	4.5/5 stars
Entertainment Weekly	C+
MSN Music (Consumer Guide)	(3-star Honorable Mention)
musicOMH	4/5 stars
NOW	4/5 Ns
Okayplayer	86/100
Slant Magazine	4/5 stars
USA Today	3/4 stars

The album received generally positive reviews from most music critics. Sullivan received many comparisons by critics to other well-known female R&B artists, such as Lauryn Hill, Amy Winehouse, Mary J. Blige, and Alicia Keys. AllMusic writer Andy Kellman gave the album four and a half out of five stars and praised her performance, stating: "There's a lot of range on display here, and there is just as much depth." Vibe's Erika Ramirez praised Sullivan's singing and lyrical substance, writing "Sullivan's vocal perfection pilots her debut album [...] and boasts her self-penned lyrics which are filled with struggle and heartache, embodying every inch of the soul star she is." NOW's Benjamin Boles commended Sullivan for her "strong voice" and the album's production, stating "she’s pulling from a pleasingly wide range of influences – dropping bits of doo-wop, roots reggae, Motown and hip-hop into the mix while maintaining a consistent feel." Houston Chronicle writer Joey Guerra wrote favorably of her songwriting and called the album "a collection brimming with attitude, edge and soul." Sal Cinquemani of Slant Magazine gave it four out of five stars and commended Sullivan for her lyrical honesty and musical range. The Washington Post's Allison Stewart described Fearless as "a mix of awkward-but-novel devices (reggae beats, Daft Punk samples) and nakedly confessional songwriting" and called it "a snappy, intensely human debut."

However, Entertainment Weekly's Simon Vozick-Levinson gave Fearless a C+ rating and described most of its music as "schmaltzy pop-&-B." Giving the album three out of five stars, About.com's Mark Edward Nero viewed her vocals as "generic and lack emotion or urgency" on some songs, but ultimately wrote that "there are more hits than misses here." Nero lauded Sullivan's vocal performance and compared her songwriting to that of R&B musician Ne-Yo, writing "due to both artists' talent for writing on-point, introspective lyrics. Like Ne-Yo, Jazmine has a knack for crafting intricate, deeply personal verses that make you feel at one with the singer. Even on the weaker songs on Fearless, the songwriting is still above par." USA Today's Steve Jones gave the album 3 out of 4 stars and wrote that she "sings every word as if she means it." MusicOMH writer Michael Cragg praised Sullivan's vocal range and themes on the album, writing "Sullivan has created a mature, engaging R&B album that doesn't rely solely on the usual tropes of sexuality, money and posturing. Instead, Fearless deals with real emotions sung in a way that convinces the listener she means every single word." Okayplayer's Jeff Harvey called it "a well produced urban pop album" and wrote that Sullivan's voice "carries a subtle tenderness that adds intriguing nuance." Jon Caramanica of The New York Times wrote favorably of Sullivan's performance, citing "Her sense of humor" as "her best asset. She doesn't have a huge, imposing voice, but she's versatile, dabbling in jazz and reggae phrasings with ease."

== Commercial performance ==
Fearless entered at number six on the Billboard 200, with first week sales of 65,000 copies. It fell to number 10 in its second week, selling 42,000 more copies. The album also peaked at number one on Billboard's Top R&B/Hip-Hop Albums chart. As of November 2010, Fearless has sold 517,000 copies in the United States.

== Accolades ==
She earned five 2009 Grammy Award nominations for the album including Best Female R&B Vocal Performance ("Need U Bad"), Best Traditional R&B Vocal Performance ("In Love with Another Man"), Best R&B Song ("Bust Your Windows"), and Best Contemporary R&B Album, while Sullivan herself was nominated for Best New Artist.

She also earned two 2010 Grammy Award nominations for Best Female R&B Vocal Performance and Best R&B Song ("Lions, Tigers, and Bears"). Vibe magazine named the album one of the Ten Best Albums of 2008.

== Track listing ==
Fearless – Standard edition
No.	Title	Writer(s)	Producer(s)	Length
1.	"Bust Your Windows (2008)"	Jazmine Sullivan; Salaam Remi	Remi	4:26
2.	"Need U Bad (2008)"	Sullivan; Melissa Elliott; Cainon Lamb; Taurian Osbourne; Nicholas Taylor Stanton; David Sinclair	Missy Elliott; Lamb^{[a]}	4:17
3.	"My Foolish Heart (2008)"	Sullivan; Carvin Haggins; Ivan Barias; Edward Brigati; Felix Cavaliere	Carvin & Ivan	3:39
4.	"Lions, Tigers & Bears (2008)"	Sullivan; Remi	Remi	4:11
5.	"Call Me Guilty (2008)"	Sullivan; Remi	Remi	3:25
6.	"One Night Stand (2008)"	Sullivan; Iman Jordan; Brian Warfield; Mac Robinson	Fisticuffs	3:33
7.	"After the Hurricane (2009)"	Sullivan; Mikkel S. Eriksen; Tor Erik Hermansen	Stargate	3:58
8.	"Dream Big (2009)"	Sullivan; Elliott; Lamb; Osbourne; Guy-Manuel de Homem-Christo; Thomas Bangalter	Elliott; Lamb^{[a]}	3:35
9.	"Live a Lie (2009)"	Sullivan; Remi	Remi	3:16
10.	"Fear (2009)"	Sullivan; Anne Dudley; Gary Langan; George M. Harry; Henry Cosby; David Pierre; Johnathon J. Jeczalik; Lula Mae Hardaway; Paul Morley; Stevie Wonder; Sylvia Moy; Trevor Horn	DJ Dirty Harry	3:54
11.	"In Love with Another Man (2009)"	Sullivan; Anthony Bell	Sullivan; Bell	4:10
12.	"Switch! (2009)"	Sullivan; Jack Splash; Ivy Hunter; William "Mickey" Stevenson	Jack Splash	3:02
Total length:				47:53

Fearless – iTunes Store and international digital edition (bonus track)
No.	Title	Writer(s)	Producer(s)	Length
13.	"Best of Me (2009)"	Jazmine Sullivan; Salaam Remi	Remi	2:47

Fearless – Deluxe edition (bonus tracks)
No.	Title	Writer(s)	Producer(s)	Length
13.	"Need U Bad" (Remix featuring T.I.)	Sullivan; Elliott; Lamb; Osbourne; Stanton; Sinclair	Elliott; Lamb^{[a]}	4:25
14.	"Dream Big" (StoneBridge Club Remix)	Sullivan; Elliott; Lamb; Osbourne; de Homem-Christo; Bangalter	Elliott; Lamb^{[a]}	6:48

Notes

- ^{^[a]} signifies a co-producer

Sample credits

- "Bust Your Windows" uses a sample from Salaam Remi's "Bad Man Waltz" and interpolates a lyric from Soulja Boy Tell Em's "Crank That (Soulja Boy)"
- "Need U Bad" uses a sample from Nicolas Taylor Stanton's "Higher Meditation Riddim Version", and Tapper Zukie's "Papa Big Shirt"
- "My Foolish Heart" uses a sample from Willie Mitchell's "Groovin'"
- "Lions, Tigers and Bears" uses a sample from Salaam Remi's "Sheila's Playground"
- "Call Me Guilty" uses a sample from Salaam Remi's "Police Theme"
- "Dream Big" uses a sample from Daft Punk's "Veridis Quo"
- "Live a Lie" uses a sample from Salaam Remi's "The Truth"
- "Fear" samples Art of Noise's "Beat Box" and interpolates elements from Stevie Wonder's "I Was Made to Love Her"
- "Switch" uses a sample from Ivy Hunter & William Stevenson "Your Cheating Ways" performed by The Marvelettes

== Personnel ==
Credits for Fearless adapted from Allmusic.

- June Ambrose – stylist
- Ivan "Orthodox" Barias – various, producer, engineer, tracking, audio production, instrumentation
- Anthony Bell – various, producer, engineer, audio production, instrumentation
- Biz & Riz – bells, Fender Rhodes
- Tim Blacksmith – management
- Anita Marisa Boriboon – art direction, design
- Danny D – management
- Dirty Harry – programming
- Peter Edge – executive producer
- Missy "Misdemeanor" Elliott – producer, engineer, executive producer, audio production
- Mikkel S. Eriksen – various, engineer, instrumentation
- Paul J. Falcone – engineer
- Ron Feuer – piano
- Fisticuffs – various, audio production
- Erwin Gorostiza – creative director
- Carvin "Ransum" Haggins – producer, engineer, tracking, audio production
- Vincent Henry – clarinet, flute, guitar, alto saxophone, baritone saxophhone, tenor saxophone
- Tor Erik Hermanson – various
- Trevor Jerideau – A&R
- Iman Jordan – piano
- Lamb Audio – production
- The Love Life – orchestra various
- Manny Marroquin – mixing
- Pepa – vocals
- David "Mr. Somebody" Pierre – piano, keyboards
- Christian Plata – mixing assistant
- Rebel One – management
- Salaam Remi – bass, percussion, piano, strings, drums, keyboards, executive producer, Fender Rhodes, audio production, instrumentation
- Harold "Jukebox" Robinson – bass
- Malachy Robinson – performer
- Johnnie "Smurf" Smith – keyboards
- Franklin Emmanuel Socorro – engineer
- Jack Splash – arranger, various, producer, performer, audio production
- Jazmine Sullivan – performer, background vocals, producer, executive producer, audio production
- Brian Warfield – performer
- Yusef Williams – hair stylist
- James M. Wisner – engineer
- James Wisner – audio engineer

== Charts ==
=== Weekly charts ===
Weekly chart performance for Fearless
Chart (2008-2013)	Peak position
French Albums (SNEP)	95
South Korean International Albums (Gaon)	42
UK R&B Albums (Official Charts)	22
US Billboard 200	6
US Top R&B/Hip-Hop Albums (Billboard)	1
US Indie Store Album Sales (Billboard)	7

=== Year-end charts ===
2008 year-end chart performance for Fearless
Chart (2008)	Position
US Billboard 200	185
US Top R&B/Hip-Hop Albums (Billboard)	43

2009 year-end chart performance for Fearless
Chart (2009)	Position
US Billboard 200	142
US Top R&B/Hip-Hop Albums (Billboard)	26

== Certifications ==
Sales and certifications for Fearless
Region	Certification	Certified units/sales
United States (RIAA)	Platinum	1,000,000^{‡}
^{‡} Sales+streaming figures based on certification alone.

== See also ==
- List of Billboard number-one R&B albums of 2008
