= Dream Big (Soda Blonde album) =

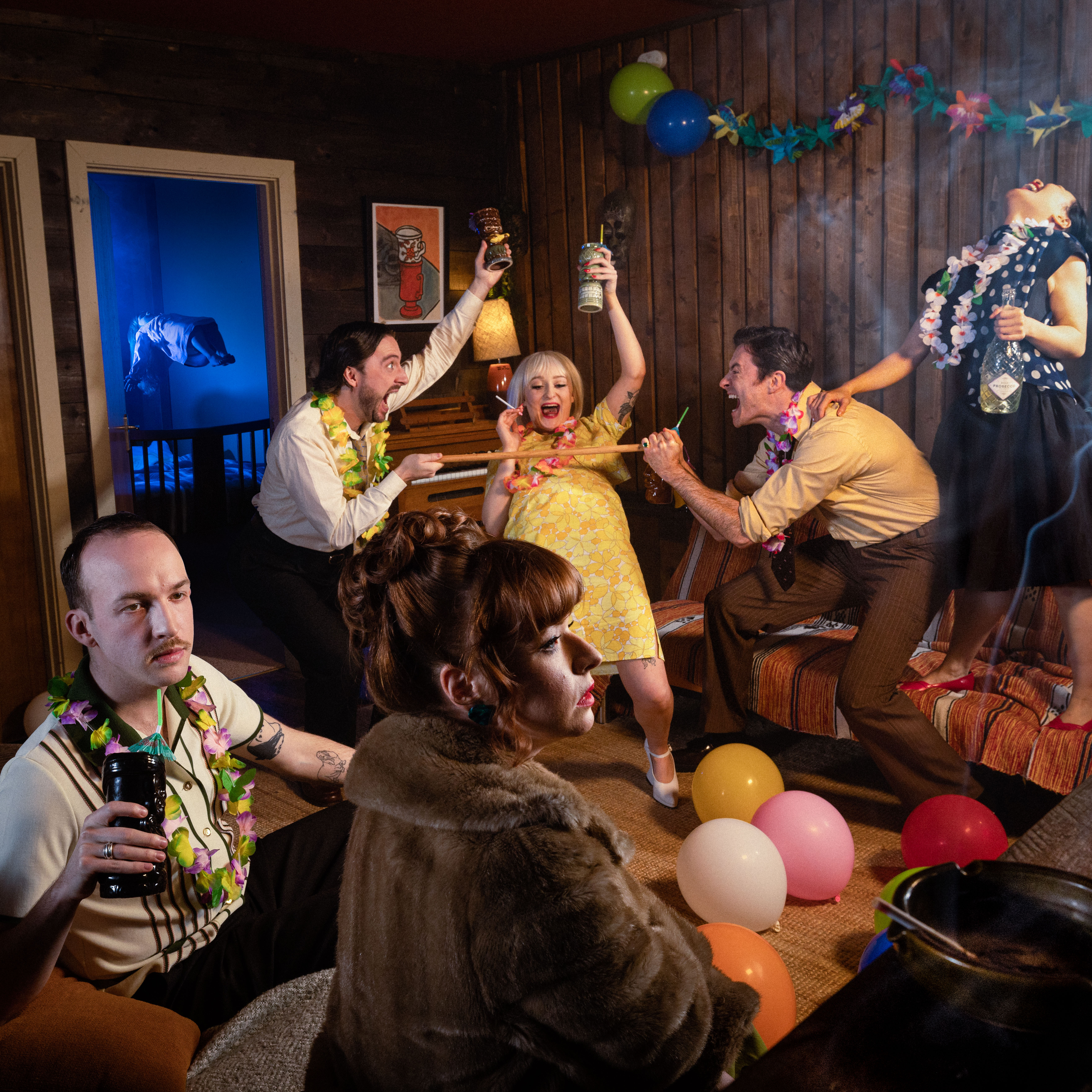

Studio album by Soda Blonde
- Released: 8 September 2023
- Genre: Pop
- Label: Overbite
- Producer: Soda Blonde

Soda Blonde chronology
Small Talk (2021)	Dream Big (2023)

Dream Big is the second studio album by Irish alternative pop band Soda Blonde, released on 8 September 2023 through their independent label, Overbite Records.

== Reception ==
The Irish Times remarked "It's a very good album by a very fine band whose dreams, you imagine, will only continue to get bigger and bolder," while RTÉ.ie stated "Dream Big is intense, dramatic stuff. It really lives up to that title," with both publications rating the album four out of five stars. Hot Press wrote "this is very much the work of a band with each member vital to the overall late-night, neon-flecked sound."

Professional ratings
Review scores
Source	Rating
The Irish Times	4/5 stars
RTÉ.ie	4/5 stars

== Track listing ==
No.	Title	Length
1.	"Midnight Show"	3:26
2.	"Bad Machine"	3:28
3.	"Boys"	3:43
4.	"Dream Big"	4:56
5.	"Space Baby"	4:21
6.	"WWDWD"	3:38
7.	"An Accident"	4:59
8.	"My First Name"	4:10
9.	"Why Die For Danzig"	4:38
10.	"Less Than Nothing"	4:30
11.	"Going Out"	7:19
Total length:		49:08

== Personnel ==
Credits for Dream Big adapted from Bandcamp.

- Faye O'Rourke – vocals
- Adam O'Regan – guitar, production, mixing
- Donagh Seaver O’Leary – bass
- Dylan Lynch – drums
- Ailbhe Clancy – violin
- Francesca De Nardi – violin
- Annemarie McGahon – viola
- Davide Forti – cello
- Loman Sherlock – trumpet
- Brian Murphy – bass trombone
