= Ephemera (Little Green Cars album) =

Studio album by Little Green Cars
- Released: March 11, 2016
- Recorded: November 2014 – September 2015
- Studios: Exchequer Street and Magennis Place, Dublin, Ireland
- Genres: Indie rock, indie folk
- Length: 50:37
- Label: Glassnote
- Producer: Rob Kirwan

Little Green Cars chronology
Absolute Zero (2013)	Ephemera (2016)

Ephemera is the second studio album by Irish indie rock band Little Green Cars, released on March 11, 2016, through Glassnote Records.

== Critical reception ==
HeadStuff criticizes most of the song length and says "it trundles along easily and even at its worst points there’s never really enough there to seriously dislike". Hotpress praises the song as "gentle and jagged".

== Commercial performance ==
At its peak in Ireland, Ephemera reached number two on the Irish Albums Chart.

== Artwork ==
The album artwork features photographs of Patrick Scott's tile mosaics at Busáras in Dublin. The design was created by Slater Design, with photography by Matthew Thompson.

== Track listing ==
1. "The Song They Play Every Night" – 3:45
2. "You vs. Me" – 4:07
3. "Easier Day" – 4:13
4. "The Garden of Death" – 3:35
5. "Brother" – 3:18
6. "Clair de Lune" – 4:27
7. "Good Women Do" – 3:49
8. "OK OK OK" – 4:13
9. "The Party" – 3:59
10. "I Don't Even Know Who" – 4:02
11. "Winds of Peace" – 5:15
12. "The Factory" – 5:54

== Personnel ==
- Stevie Appleby – vocals, guitar
- Faye O'Rourke – vocals, guitar
- Adam O'Regan – guitar, piano, synthesisers, vocals
- Donagh Seaver O'Leary – bass, vocals
- Dylan Lynch – drums, vocals

Additional personnel

- Rob Kirwan – production
- Vlado Meller – mastering
- Slater Design – design
- Matthew Thompson – photography
