= Child's Play (British game show) =

British television game show (1984–1988)

- Created by: Mark Goodson
- Presented by: Michael Aspel
- Voices of: Robin Houston
- Country of origin: United Kingdom
- Original language: English
- No. of series: 5
- No. of episodes: 79

Production
- Running time: 30 minutes (inc. adverts)
- Production company: LWT

Original release
- Network: ITV
- Release: 7 January 1984 – 26 August 1988

Related
- Small Talk

Child's Play is a British game show based on the American format of the same name. It aired on ITV from 7 January 1984 to 26 August 1988 and was hosted by Michael Aspel. The first series was produced by Keith Stewart with subsequent series produced by Richard Hearsey who also worked on the first series as associate producer.

== Format ==
Two teams, consisting of one celebrity and one contestant, competed. The object of the game was to correctly identify words based on videotaped definitions given by primary school-age children. The game was played in four rounds.

=== Round 1 ===
In the first round, a word was given to the home audience and a video clip of a child defining that word was played. Any incriminating words (including the word itself) were censored. Once the clip ended, the team in control had a chance to guess the word; a correct response earned 15 points. If the team was incorrect, the opponents viewed a clip of another child defining the same word; a correct response earned 10 points. If the opponents were wrong, control passed back to the team that was shown the first clip, who saw one final clip (usually of an older child, and the answer usually not that hard to guess by this point); a correct response earned 5 points. If that team was still wrong, Aspel announced the correct answer and no points were awarded. The first round continued, with teams alternating control on words, until time was called.

=== Round 2: Triple Play ===
Each team, starting with the trailing team, had 45 seconds to guess as many words as possible, with a limit of three definitions per word. Each correct response earned 10 points.

=== Round 3 ===
The team in control was shown three video clips, one after another, of children defining one word that was given to the home audience. Each correct response was worth 50 points. If the team in control was incorrect, control was passed to the opponents for the same point value. If that team was wrong, Aspel announced the correct answer and no points were awarded. Each team played one word in this round.

=== Round 4: Fast Play ===
Both teams were given the opportunity to guess what word the child was defining by hitting a buzzer to interrupt the video clip and guess the word. 20 points were given for a correct answer, and if the player buzzed in with an incorrect guess the rest of the clip was played for the opponent before he/she got to guess. Play continued until time was called. The team in the lead at the end of the game won the game and received a prize package. If the game ended in a tie, one additional word was played.

== Broadcast history ==
- Series 1: 16 editions from 7 January 1984 – 21 April 1984
- Series 2: 16 editions from 26 August 1984 – 16 December 1984
- Series 3a: 13 editions from 31 August 1985 – 23 November 1985
- Christmas Special: 22 December 1985
- Series 3b: 3 editions from 5 April 1986 – 19 April 1986
- Series 4a: 3 editions from 26 April 1986 – 10 May 1986
- Series 4b: 14 editions from 14 September 1986 – 14 December 1986
- Series 5a: 6 editions from 6 September 1987 – 11 October 1987
- Series 5b: 7 editions from 1 April 1988 – 26 August 1988
