= Small Talk (American game show) =

- Genre: Game show
- Directed by: Rob Fiedler
- Presented by: Wil Shriner
- Music by: Marc Ellis
- Country of origin: United States
- Original language: English
- No. of seasons: 1
- No. of episodes: 65

Production
- Executive producer: Robert Crystal
- Producer: Gary Johnson
- Running time: 24 minutes
- Production company: Reg Grundy Productions

Original release
- Network: The Family Channel
- Release: September 30, 1996 – January 17, 1997

Related
- Child's Play

Small Talk is an American game show hosted by comedian Wil Shriner and produced by Reg Grundy Productions based on the British game show of the same name that aired on The Family Channel from September 30, 1996, to January 3, 1997. Reruns continued until January 17. The series aired as part of an original game show block, alongside The New Shop 'Til You Drop, Shopping Spree, Wait 'til You Have Kids, and The New Family Challenge. Small Talk along with Kids and Family Challenge would all be cancelled by the end of 1997. This left The New Shop 'til You Drop and Shopping Spree as the only two game shows left on the block and the only ones (except Family Challenge) to last more than a single season.

== Production ==
Small Talk aired on the The Family Channel from September 30, 1996 to January 1997. It was directed by Rob Fiedler. Made by Reg Grundy Productions, the show was executive produced by Robert Crystal and produced by Gary Johnson.

== Main game ==
Three contestants faced a game board of seven children, each on a different monitor. Before the taping, the children were asked a series of questions and their answers were videotaped. The contestants attempted to predict how the children responded.

=== Rounds 1 and 2 ===
In the first two rounds, a question with two choices was presented, usually about the children (e.g., "Would you rather watch T.V. or go to the movies?" or "Do men or women make better drivers?"). The contestants secretly predicted how the majority of the children answered that question. The first contestant then selected one of the children, at which point Shriner read a just-for-fun question related to the main question, which may or may not provide a clue to the child's answer of the main question. The contestant then guessed the child's response to the main question. The child's answer was then played, and if the contestant predicted correctly, he/she scored points. This same process was repeated with the other two contestants. Each player attempted to predict the response of two children.

After the sixth child was played, Shriner announced the majority answer, after which the contestants' earlier prediction was revealed. Contestants earned additional points for correctly predicting the majority answer.

==== Scoring format ====
Round	Individual question	Majority bonus
Round 1	10	20
Round 2	20	40

=== Speed round ===
In the speed round, contestants predicted immediately after selecting a child rather than after a clue had been revealed. Additionally, no majority bonus was awarded, and the questions pertained to general knowledge (e.g., "What is poison ivy?") or performing a physical skill (e.g., "Do you know how to use chopsticks?"). In this round, each correct answer was worth 60 points. If a player could no longer overtake the leader, they were eliminated from further play. The player with the most points won the game, $500, and advanced to the bonus round for an additional $1,000.

If the game ended in a two-way tie, the winner of a coin toss executed before the show played the first available child. If the contestant predicted correctly, he/she won, otherwise, their opponent won the game.

== Bonus round ==
The host posed one final question to which all of the children earlier responded. Lights randomly flashed around the children and the champion selected a child by hitting a button on their podium. After a child was selected, the contestant again attempted to predict the child's response. During the first three weeks, correctly predicting three responses before making three mistakes earned the champion an additional $1,000.

After the first three weeks, the contestant was only permitted two mistakes before the bonus round ended instead of three. During weeks eight through thirteen, different questions were posed to each child, and the contestant attempted to correctly predict three responses as before without making two mistakes to win.

=== Three-player version ===
If the main game ended in a three-way tie, all three contestants advanced to the bonus round. Each contestant chose a child randomly in the manner described above. When a child was selected, each contestant secretly predicted how the child responded to a question. The child's answer was then played back, after which the contestants' predictions were revealed. Incorrect predictions eliminated contestants from play, and the final player remaining won the entire $1,500.

== Reception ==
In a mostly positive review, Joan Van Tassel of The Hollywood Reporter called the set "well-designed" and said Wil Shriner, the host, was "relaxed and funny, although his humor is a bit on the adult side for the presumably mixed kid-adult target audience". She thought that Small Talk "could have used some funnier moments or re-edited the ones they had in the can to provide a better comic flow".
