= Little Green Cars =

Irish indie rock band

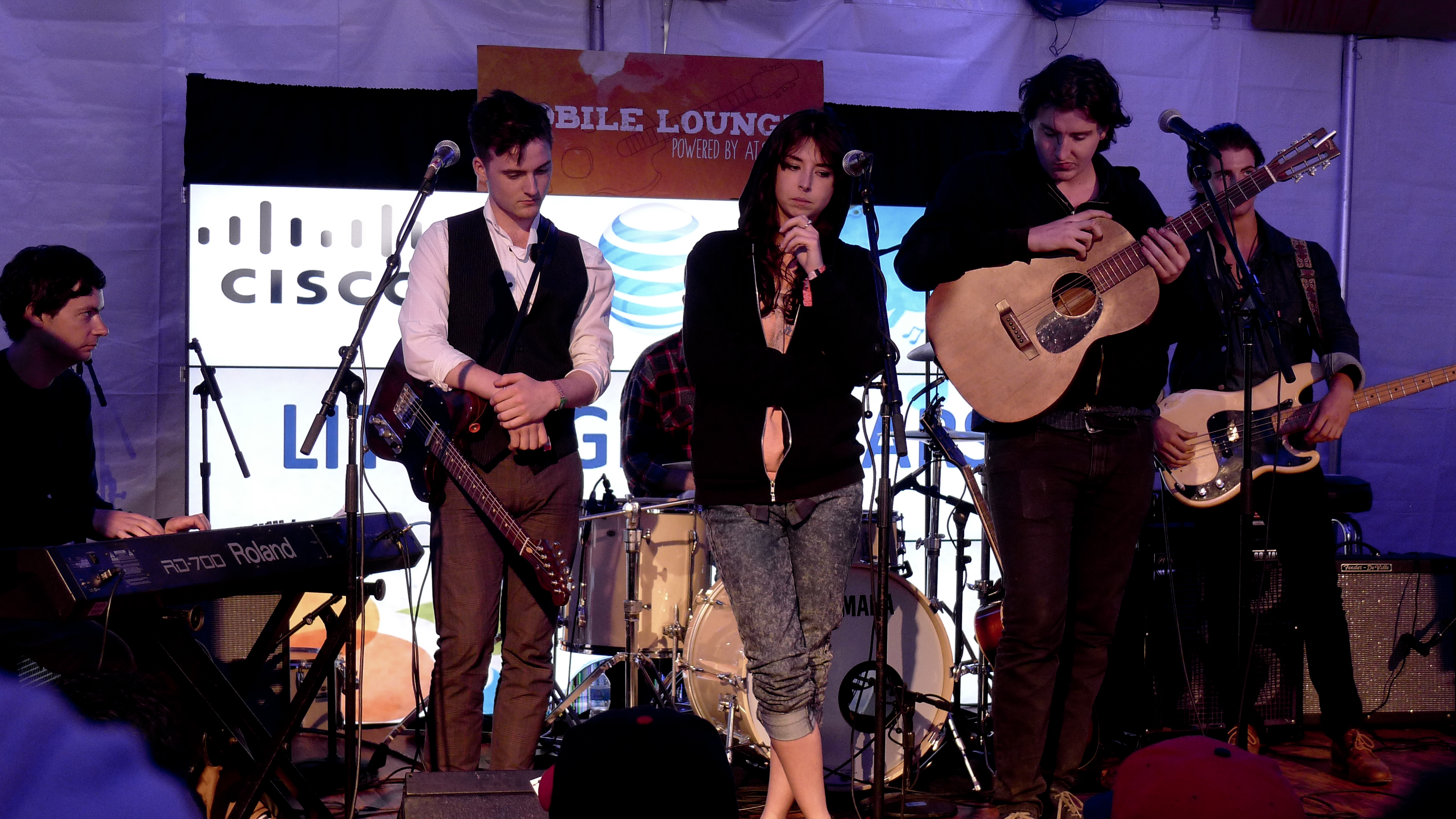
- Little Green Cars in 2013

Background information
- Origin: Dublin, Ireland
- Genres: Indie rock; alternative rock
- Years active: 2008–2019
- Labels: Island, Glassnote
- Past members: Stevie Appleby; Dylan Lynch; Donagh Seaver O'Leary; Adam O'Regan; Faye O'Rourke
- Website: littlegreencars.com

Little Green Cars was an Irish indie rock band formed in Dublin in 2008. The band announced on 21 March 2019 that they were disbanding. In the wake of the band's breakup, four of the band members formed Soda Blonde while Stevie Appleby went on to a solo career.

== History ==
2008-2012: Formation and early years

Little Green Cars formed in Dublin, Ireland, in 2008. The band was founded by childhood friends Stevie Appleby (vocals, guitar) and Adam O’Regan (guitar, vocals), who began writing and recording music together daily after school. They were later joined by Faye O’Rourke (vocals, guitar), Donagh Seaver O’Leary (bass, vocals), and Dylan Lynch (drums, vocals), completing the five-piece lineup.

The members met as teenagers and rehearsed in a garden shed at Appleby's home, where they began crafting their early sound. In 2008, the band self-released two EPs, Volume I and Volume II, which helped attract attention from UK labels. Their first UK release was a 7" single of "The John Wayne" on the Young and Lost Club label, produced by David Kosten and backed with the B-side "Glass Case".

In January 2012, Little Green Cars signed with the New York-based label Glassnote Records and began touring extensively across the United States and the UK. Their growing reputation led to an appearance performing their single "Harper Lee" on Late Night with Jimmy Fallon and slots at major festivals including SXSW, Coachella, Lollapalooza, and Osheaga.

2013-2015: Absolute Zero

The release of Absolute Zero in March 2013 marked a significant turning point in the trajectory of Little Green Cars. After years of writing and rehearsing in garden sheds and bedrooms in suburban Dublin, the band found themselves catapulted onto the international stage with a debut album that captured the raw vulnerability and melodic ambition that had defined their earliest work.

Produced by Markus Dravs known for working with Arcade Fire and Mumford & Sons the album was recorded at Angelic Studios in Northamptonshire, England.

Absolute Zero featured "The John Wayne", which proved to be a popular single. In an interview with DIY Magazine, Appleby said it was "about unrequited love and brutal rejection." In another song, "My Love Took Me Down to the River to Silence Me", vocalist Faye O’Rourke step into the spotlight, delivered an emotional performance that offered a change to Appleby's tone.

The album explored experimental sounds with songs like "Red and Blue", which incorporated electronic aspects and vocoder effects.

Upon its release, "Absolute Zero" debuted at number one on the Irish Albums Chart, and made its way onto the UK Albums Chart, peaking at number 94. It was met with critical acclaim both in Ireland and abroad, praised for its mature songwriting, polished production, and the vocal interplay between Appleby and O'Rourke.

The success of the album saw the band embark on an extensive international tour, including appearances at Coachella, Lollapalooza, Osheaga, and a performance on Late Night with Jimmy Fallon.

2016-2018: Ephemera

After their debut Absolute Zero, Little Green Cars shifted focus to their next project. They started recording Ephemera (Little Green Cars album), their second studio album, in November 2014, working in Dublin at Exchequer Street and Magennis Place. The sessions ran through September 2015, with the band producing alongside Rob Kirwan and Vlado Meller mastering the tracks. Personal events, like the sudden death of guitarist Adam O'Regan's father, and navigating relationship changes, shaped the album’s themes of love, loss, and transition. Glassnote Records released it on March 11, 2016.

The album includes 12 tracks, with "The Song They Play Every Night" released as the lead single on January 7, 2016.

Around this time, guitarist and singer Adam O'Regan stepped into directing music videos for the band. He began with "Easier Day," filmed in Tokyo with actor Hugh O’Connor and premiered on March 3, 2016, followed by videos for "The Garden of Death" and "Clair De Lune," released on July 5 and June 15, 2016, respectively.

When Ephemera came out, reviews were split. The Irish Times highlighted it as having "the most harmonious songs you’ll hear all year" for its vocal arrangements. HeadStuff found it "dull," suggesting it lacked spark. The artwork, designed by Slater Design with photography by Matthew Thompson, used Patrick Scott’s Busáras mosaics, tying it to their Dublin roots. Unlike Absolute Zero, which topped the Irish charts, Ephemera didn’t gain the same commercial traction, reflecting a quieter chapter for the band.

2019-present: Dissolution and subsequent projects

Little Green Cars reached the end of their run after over a decade together. On March 21, 2019, they announced their dissolution via a statement on Twitter, describing it as a mutual decision based on personal and artistic reasons. They made it clear there were no conflicts, noting "no terrible calamity, no heartless betrayal and no punches thrown." Later interviews pointed to artistic differences as a key factor, signaling it was time for new directions.

Soon after, four members—Faye O'Rourke, Adam O'Regan, Donagh Seaver O'Leary, and Dylan Lynch—formed Soda Blonde in 2019. Soda Blonde kicked off with a debut gig at Hogan's in Dublin in May 2019 and released two EPs that year, Terrible Hands and isolation content. Soda Blonde’s first album, Small Talk, came out on July 9, 2021, via Velveteen Records, earning a nomination for the Choice Music Prize in 2022. Their second album, Dream Big, followed in September 2023, topping the Irish Independent's "Best Irish Albums of 2023" list.

Stevie Appleby, the fifth member, took a different path. He stepped away from music for two years after the breakup, avoiding the guitar entirely during that period. He returned in 2021 with his solo single "Mother Of Pearl," followed by his self-titled EP later that year, featuring tracks like "Hand Me Down". Alongside music, Appleby pursued his career as a visual artist, holding exhibitions in Dublin and the UK and selling art through his website and Duke Street gallery.

== Discography ==
Little Green Cars discography
- Studio albums: 2
- EPs: 3
- Singles: 7

=== Studio albums ===
Year	Details	Peak chart positions		
Year	Details	US Heatseekers	IRL	UK
2013	Absolute Zero: Released: 22 March 2013; Label: Glassnote; Formats: CD, download, Vinyl	19	1	94
2016	Ephemera: Released: 11 March 2016; Label: Glassnote; Formats: CD, download, vinyl	—	2	—
"—" denotes a title that did not chart.

=== EPs ===
Year	Details
2008	Volume I: Released: 2008; Label: Little Green Records
2008	Volume II: Released: 2008; Label: Little Green Records
2013	Harper Lee: Released: 2013; Label: Glassnote

=== Singles ===
Year	Title	Peak chart positions		Album
Year	Title	IRL	UK	Album
2012	"The John Wayne"	—	—	Absolute Zero
2013	"Harper Lee"	—	—	Absolute Zero
2013	"My Love Took Me Down To The River To Silence Me"	—	—	Absolute Zero
2013	"Big Red Dragon"	—	—	Absolute Zero
2016	"The Song They Play Every Night"	—	—	Ephemera
2016	"Easier Day"	—	—	Ephemera
2016	"Clair De Lune	—	—	Ephemera
"—" denotes a title that did not chart.
