= Small Talk (Vietnamese game show) =

Small Talk Vietnam (in Vietnamese: Chuyện nhỏ) was a Vietnamese adaptation of British game show, Small Talk, aired on Hồ Chí Minh City Radio and Television from 2005 to 2007 and from 2010 to 2014.

== Broadcast rights ==
Hồ Chí Minh Radio and Television and Vietnamese TV producing company, Đông Tây Promotion, bought the rights to produce and air the gameshow in Vietnam in 2005 from multi-national TV producing brand, Fremantlemedia. The show was produced in part by Vietnamese film producer, HKFilm.

The show was first broadcast on HTV7 from 2005 to 2007, at 7pm timeslot.

In 2010, Hồ Chí Minh Radio and Television announced the return of Chuyện nhỏ.

== Gameplay ==
The Vietnamese adaptation kept the rule as same as the original version. However, there were only seven children - instead of nine like the original version - presented with the host, comedian - actor and dancer Thanh Bạch, who was well known at the time in Vietnam.

Thanh Bạch hosted every edition of the show, explaining:

"There aren't many television shows [that] always give me the infinite fresh ideas, excitement and surprising fun like [Small Talk]. Each year, each edition, each young participants always brings interesting things [to the show]."

There were also three contestants joining the game. Contestants could register to join the show. However, the organizer prioritized players who were parents of children between 6 to 9 years old. In the 2011-2012 version, the gameshow producer invited some Vietnamese artists and well-known personalities to play as contestants.

In 2011 version, a child was selected by the player in the final round as the "Most Favorable Child". Sponsors' representative would give the prize for him or her based on the final round player's decision.

== Children players ==
According to the article from Tuổi Trẻ Newspaper, the children, from the age 6 to 9, were selected by the gameshow organizer from various elementary schools in Hồ Chí Minh City.

After being selected, they were picked up and well taken care of by the gameshow organizer. They, then, were asked some questions from the questionnaire. The producer asked, interviewed and recorded around 20 children per day.

The questions chosen to interview children participants in Vietnamese adaptation were based on the original question set from FremantleMedia and made by Vietnamese Master of Education, Ms. Nguyễn Thị Bích Hồng. In later version, viewers can submit the question to the questionnaire and awarded and invited to be the live audience, if selected.

== Sponsors ==
The gameshow was also made possible by several sponsors, including:

- Nestle
- Vạn Thành Mattress
- Lotte Koala's March

== Reception ==
Vietnamese viewers and contestants praised the gameshow while Vietnamese newspapers review the game and claimed the show had helped the adults better understand the children.

=== Awards ===
Small Talk Vietnam (or Chuyện nhỏ) was awarded with the Golden Medal in the Best Gameshow of the Year category in Vietnam's 25th National Television Festival, alongside with Vietnam Television's Ở nhà Chủ nhật (in English, lit.: Fun Sunday at Home)
