= Small Talk (British game show) =

British television game show (1994–1996)

- Genre: Game show
- Presented by: Ronnie Corbett
- Country of origin: United Kingdom
- Original language: English
- No. of series: 4
- No. of episodes: 52

Production
- Running time: 30 minutes
- Production company: Reg Grundy Productions

Original release
- Network: BBC1
- Release: 24 July 1994 – 18 December 1996

Related
- Child's Play

Small Talk is a British television game show that aired on BBC1 from 24 July 1994 to 18 December 1996 and is hosted by Ronnie Corbett.

== Gameplay ==
=== Rounds 1 and 2 ===
Corbett asks the three contestants a question that they asked panel of 9 children (10 or 11 if 1 or 2 squares have pairs). The contestants secretly lock in what they think the majority of the panel answered (the majority guess), and those who are correct get 10 points (5 points in series 1) in round one and 20 points (10 points in series 1) in round two.

After this, one by one, the contestants picked a single child or single pair of children and guess what he, she or they said, and if correct they score 20 points (10 points in series 1) in Round 1 and 30 points (20 points in series 1) in Round 2. During the first series, an incorrect prediction eliminated that player until the end of the round.

=== Round 3 ===
In this round, only the two players with the highest scores are allowed to play. Now, players alternated thrice by randomly selecting children by square with buzzers located at their lecterns. Otherwise, gameplay is the same, awarding players 40 points per match (30 in series 1).

=== Final round ===
In the final round, the winner will try to turn his or her main game score to 500 and to do this they must do the following. The contestant picks 5 panelists and each is given a question. Each kid or pair holds a card with a number on it from 50 to 500 (4 have 50, 2 each of 100 and 250, and one 500). If the contestant guesses the response of the kid or pair correctly he or she will get the points on the card added to his or her overall score. If the contestant gets 500 points or more they will win a weekend holiday. If the winner scored less than 500 points, he or she would be treated to a night out. All players received a souvenir Small Talk trophy.

== Transmissions ==
Series	Start date	End date	Episodes
1*	24 July 1994	25 September 1994	12
1*	6 August 1995	20 August 1995	12
2	14 May 1995	30 July 1995	12
3	15 May 1996	28 August 1996	12
4	4 September 1996	18 December 1996	16

- Series 1 was originally supposed to air until 23 October 1994 with a 2 week break after the sixth episode, but came back a week early and stopped airing after the ninth episode on 25 September 1994. The last three episodes had to wait until after the second series had it run and were eventually aired in August 1995.

== International versions ==
Country	Local name	Host(s)	Network	Year aired
Germany	Small Talk	Birgit Lechtermann	RTL	1997–1998
Greece	Oσα Ξέpει τo Παιδί; Osa Xépei to Paidí	Yannis Zouganelis	Mega Channel	1998–1999
Indonesia	Celoteh Anak	Dewi Hughes	Indosiar	18 April 2002 – 30 September 2005
South Africa	Small Talk	James Lennox	SABC 2	2005
Sweden	Småpratarna	Renée Nyberg; Peppe Eng	TV4	17 October 1993 – 3 November 1997
Thailand	Small Talk	Somkiat Chanpram	Workpoint TV	2017
United States	Small Talk	Wil Shriner	The Family Channel	30 September 1996 – 3 January 1997
Vietnam	Chuyện nhỏ	Thanh Bạch	HTV7	2005–2007; 2010–2014
