= Lions, Tigers & Bears (song) =

Single by Jazmine Sullivan

from the album Fearless
- Released: November 11, 2008 or December 16, 2008
- Recorded: 2007-2008
- Genre: Neo soul, orchestral, R&B, downtempo
- Length: 4:11
- Label: J Records; Puppy Love; Arista
- Songwriters: J. Sullivan; S. Remi
- Producer: Salaam Remi

Jazmine Sullivan singles chronology
"Bust Your Windows" (2008)	"Lions, Tigers & Bears" (2008)	"Dream Big" (2009)

"Lions, Tigers & Bears" is the fourth single released from American R&B–soul singer Jazmine Sullivan's debut album Fearless. The song impacted radio on November 11, 2008, and was released on December 16, 2008, as the album's third single. At the 51st Annual Grammy Awards, the song was nominated for Best Female R&B Vocal Performance and Best R&B Song.

== Background ==
"Lions, Tigers and Bears" uses a sample from Salaam Remi's "Shila's Playground". It was written by Sullivan and Remi. The song is a soulful melody, written in Dorian Mode, about love and heartbreak using instrumentation of a violin. The protagonist states that she's not scared of things most people fear, such as facing carnivorous animals, but she's scared to love because of potential heartbreak. Sullivan said that, "the lions, tigers and bears reference represents my career in the music business."

The phrase "Lions, tigers and bears" comes from a passage spoken by the Tin Man, Dorothy, and the Scarecrow in The Wizard of Oz.

== Reception ==
Soul Bounce reviewed the song:

Her latest, "Lions, Tigers & Bears," seemingly belies the "Fearless" album title, with Jazzy breaking down to a prospective paramour that kings of the jungle, Seigfried & Roy's crew AND Yogi are all cool with her, but this love thing? Yeah, scary as hell. What I love most about this track is the haunting melody, and of course, that voice. Lawd.

== Music video ==
A music video premiered on Sullivan's MySpace blog promoting Jazmine Sullivan's single on January 29, 2009. It shows her performing in the middle of a gray-colored town while surrounded by floating, transparent violins. The town eventually becomes more colorful as time progresses. First, a golden color is seen spreading on the street inspired by The Wizard of Oz (as is the title of the song), meeting with blue color in intersection, where a couple is having a fight. Later, orange is introduced as the main color of another couple's outfits as they argue in the balcony of an apartment, while a tiger arrives and runs through the streets. A third couple is introduced, bringing the color purple to the town.

During the bridge, Jazmine performs on top of a skyscraper, still surrounded by the violins. The violins are then attacked by the tiger, creating a heart-shaped area of purple mist around Jazmine. Once the bridge is completed, the video returns to Jazmine performing at the yellow brick road (which again, is inspired by The Wizard of Oz, like the title of the song) and a brain appears and the girl in the blue and walks away from the guy she is seeing. A lion of courage appears on the back of the man's jacket in purple and he gets the "courage" to walk away. A heart appears on the girl in orange and she embraces her lover. This is in direct reference to The Wizard of Oz and the tinman, the lion and the scarecrow. The video ranked at No. 88 on BET's Notarized: Top 100 Videos of 2009 countdown.

== Credits and personnel ==
Credits adapted from the album's liner notes.

- Produced by: Salaam Remi
- Recorded by: Salaam Remi, Franklin Emmanuel Socotto
- Written by: Jazmine Sullivan, Salaam Remi
- Instruments: Salaam Remi

== Remixes ==
- Fabolous is featured on the official remix.
- The-Dream has covered the song.
- Yo Gotti has recorded a freestyle
- Beyonce covered it at her Mrs. Carter Tour in 2013.
- Will has done a remix with Pattie.

== Charts ==
=== Weekly charts ===
Chart (2009)	Peak position
US Billboard Hot 100	74
US Hot R&B/Hip-Hop Songs (Billboard)	10

=== Year-end charts ===
Chart (2009)	Position
US Hot R&B/Hip-Hop Songs (Billboard)	71

== Certifications ==
Region	Certification	Certified units/sales
United States (RIAA)	Gold	500,000^{‡}
^{‡} Sales+streaming figures based on certification alone.

== Release history ==
List of release dates, showing region, and release format
Region	Date	Label
United States	November 11, 2008	J Records, Puppy Love, Arista
