= Wil Shriner =

American film director

- Born: Wil Herbert Shriner; New York City, New York, U.S.
- Occupations: Comedian; actor; film director; screenwriter; game show host
- Parent: Herb Shriner
- Relatives: Kin Shriner (twin brother)

Wil Herbert Shriner is an American actor, comedian, film director, screenwriter and game show host.

== Life and career ==
Shriner was born in New York City, New York, the twin brother of soap opera actor Kin Shriner, and the son of Eileen "Pixie" McDermott and Herb Shriner, a Hoosier humorist who had several shows in the early days of television, including Two for the Money and The Herb Shriner Show. Wil made his first appearance on The Tonight Show Starring Johnny Carson and then went on to be a regular on the NBC morning show The David Letterman Show. For one season in the 1980s [September 14, 1987 – August 5, 1988], he hosted The Wil Shriner Show, a nationally syndicated Group W television talk show. TV Guide described the program as "a daily variety-talk show featuring celebrity guests, segments on health and fitness, and interviews with authors and experts."

He also hosted two game shows, the American version of That's My Dog (replacing Steve Skrovan) from 1993 until its cancellation in 1995 and Small Talk. During the early 1990s, he also hosted a weekly syndicated series about amateur and well-known inventors called Why Didn't I Think of That?, which ran for two years. He also hosted the Miss Teen USA 1989 pageant. He spent four years as a correspondent and guest host on the ABC network morning show The Home Show.

He began directing sitcoms in 2000, including episodes of Frasier, Becker, and Everybody Loves Raymond. He also directed episodes of Raising Dad, My Wife and Kids, Norm, Married to the Kellys, Luis, Ladies Man, Two Guys and a Girl, and Living With Fran.

In 2006, he wrote the screenplay for, and directed the feature film Hoot, which was released by New Line Cinema on over 3000 screens. The family film came out on DVD in August 2006. Hoot was added to the film collection of the Museum of Modern Art in 2009.

He now regularly appears on the Paul and Young Ron morning radio show on BIG105.9 FM and also on Real Radio 92.1 FM. He is also the host of the weekly The Johnny Carson Show podcast.
