= Dream Big (Jazmine Sullivan song) =

Single by Jazmine Sullivan

from the album Fearless
- Released: February 9, 2009
- Recorded: 2008
- Genre: Dance-pop, synth-pop, techno, upbeat pop
- Length: 3:35
- Label: J; Columbia
- Songwriters: Thomas Bangalter; Guy-Manuel de Homem-Christo; Missy Elliott; Cainon Lamb; Taurian Osbourne; Jazmine Sullivan
- Producers: Missy Elliott; Cainon Lamb

Jazmine Sullivan singles chronology
| "Lions, Tigers & Bears" (2009) | "Dream Big" (2009) | "Champion" (2009) |

"Dream Big" is a song by American recording artist Jazmine Sullivan. It was written by Missy Elliott, Cainon Lamb, Taurian Osbourne, and Sullivan for her debut studio album Fearless (2008), while production was helmed by Elliott and Lamb. The dance-pop-heavy track prominently features a sample of Daft Punk's song "Veridis Quo" from the album Discovery (2001).

"Dream Big" was made available on UK iTunes and 7 Digital as an EP on February 9, 2009. It was later made available for airplay on UK radio stations on April 5, 2009. and then received an official single digital release on April 6, 2009.

== Background and reception ==
"Dream Big" prominently features a sample of Daft Punk's song "Veridis Quo" from the album Discovery. The song is about a girl dreaming to be a big star; it's about taking opportunities when they come to you and being ready to go when the time comes. The song is produced by Missy Elliott, Jazmine's mentor who provides vocals in the intro using a line typically reserved for Missy's own songs. Overall the song was said 'to be a very unexpected sound from Jazmine', in comparison with the previous seven tracks on the album. Namely the synthy, upbeat and techno sound it has to it. The different approach to the club-friendly song is what's said to give it an edge as well as an extra benefit for its airplay success. Dream Big appeared on major UK music critic, Popjustice's website as 'Song of the Day' and was described as an excellent track and something to watch out for.

Jazmine describes her inspiration behind the song:

"My journey was not an easy one. There were people telling me I wasn't what the industry wanted. So I had to persevere and stay determined to live my dream. I wrote this song to encourage people all over the world to dream big despite the road blocks."

Billboard reviewed the song:

"Dream Big", a swallow-you-whole-four-four thumper, is an ambitious motivational anthem. Missy Elliott nicks nearly all of its drive and dramatics from Daft Punk's "Veridis Quo".

Epinions reviewed the song:

Missy calls out in the intro using a line typically reserved for her own songs (if that's not a sign of faith in one's work, I don't know what is). It's an out and out Euro techno club track, complete with a clever cache of synth lines via Daft Punk's "Veridis Quo" and an assortment of gimmicky techno sounds that just don't sound gimmicky; Jazmine just understands that her credibility is in her authenticity and she doesn't miss the slightest detail. The song itself is about taking opportunities when they come to you, about being ready to go when the time comes. The fact that she manages to take on a genre seemingly foreign to her talents in such a convincing manner is a testament to what happens when you dream big.

== Release and reception ==
Jazmine performed "Dream Big" on popular French television show "Le Grand Journal" as part of her international 2009 promotion of her first album, "Fearless". She also performed it along with several of her album tracks for UK BBC Radio 1's Trevor Nelson in April, 2009. On April 18, 2009 the single peaked at #164 on the UK Singles Chart after a surge of steady download sales during that week.

"Dream Big" peaked at #6 on the Turkish Singles Chart issued March 30, 2009, making it Jazmine's first hit single outside the U.S. The track then went on to make waves on European airplay charts in countries such as Greece and Russia.

== Music video ==
In March 2009, the music video for "Dream Big" premiered. It features Jazmine sitting behind a table and writing down her plans to get her dream. Basically mirroring the song by chronicling Jazmine's journey from songwriter to singer. Her handwriting reads as letters on the book appear on screen matching with the song lyrics. Then the video moves onto capturing her in studio, crafting songs and then performing on stage in front of an audience. The video received generally favourable reviews by fans. It was viewed as her best yet by some and 'cheap' by others. Being produced by Syndrome, who also produced Jazmine's previous video for Lions, Tigers & Bears, the two were closely compared and the animation theme was criticized to not show the real Jazmine, the Jazmine that fans know and love.

== Formats and track listings ==
UK Digital bundle

1. "Dream Big" (Album Version) — 3:35
2. "Dream Big" (Ghettopop Remix) — 3:49
3. "Dream Big" (Monk & Prof Club Remix) — 4:15
4. "Dream Big" (StoneBridge Remix) — 6:45

UK digital single

1. "Dream Big" (Radio Edit) — 2:33

== Credits and personnel ==
Credits adapted from the album's liner notes.

- A&R: Trevor Jerdeau
- Management: Rebel One, Pam Sullivan
- Mixing: Manny Marroquin, Christian Plat
- Production Missy Elliott, Cainon Lamb
- Recording: Missy Elliott, Paul J. Falcone, Scott Berger-Felder
- Vocal assistance: Missy Elliott

== Charts ==
| Chart (2009) | Peak position |
|---|---|
| UK Singles (OCC) | 164 |

== Release history ==
List of release dates, showing region, and release format
| Region | Date | Format(s) | Label |
|---|---|---|---|
| United Kingdom | February 9, 2009 | Digital EP | J Records, Columbia Records |
| United Kingdom | April 6, 2009 | Digital single | J Records, Columbia Records |
| United States | April 14, 2009 | CD single | J Records, Columbia Records |
