= Soda Blonde =

Irish alt-pop band

- Origin: Dublin
- Genre: alt-pop
- Years active: 2019–present
- Spinoff of: Little Green Cars
- Members: Faye O'Rourke; Adam O'Regan; Donagh Seaver-O'Leary; Dylan Lynch
- Website: sodablonde.com

Soda Blonde are an Irish alt-pop band from Dublin, formed in 2019 by former members of Little Green Cars.

== Career ==
Soda Blonde was founded in 2019 by former members of Little Green Cars. They released two EPs and in 2021 their debut album Small Talk, which was nominated for the Choice Music Prize.

Their second album Dream Big was released in September 2023 to critical acclaim, later ranked by the Irish Independent as Number 1 on their list of "Best Irish Albums of 2023".

== Personnel ==
- Faye O'Rourke (vocals)
- Adam O'Regan (guitar)
- Donagh Seaver-O'Leary (bass)
- Dylan Lynch (drums)

== Discography ==
EPs

- Terrible Hands (2019)
- Isolation Content (2020)
- People Pleaser (2025)

Albums

- Small Talk (2021)
- Dream Big (2023)
