= Danny Kelly (journalist) =

Music journalist and sports presenter (1956–2026)

- Born: Daniel John Kelly; 22 December 1956; Islington, London, England
- Died: 10 November 2026 (aged 69); Dublin, Ireland
- Occupations: Music journalist, sports presenter, internet publisher
- Spouse: Alex Clark (m. 2021)

Daniel John Kelly (22 December 1956 – 10 November 2026) was an English music journalist, sports presenter and internet publisher. He was the editor of the music weekly New Musical Express and Q magazine.

== Early life ==
Daniel Kelly was born in Islington, London, on 22 December 1956, to Irish parents and attended Sacred Heart primary school in Harrow and then St Aloysius' College, Highgate. Kelly worked in print and radio journalism for over thirty years. He began writing for New Musical Express (NME) in about 1983 and was its editor from the late 1980s to 1992.

Kelly later edited the British music monthly Q, and was awarded the title British Magazine Editor of the Year for his work there. He left in 1995. He also launched the sports monthly Total Sport. He often worked in partnership with fellow sports fan and radio journalist Danny Baker, who is also an NME alumnus, having broadcast in both commercial and BBC radio.

== Career ==
In the mid-1990s, Kelly hosted Under the Moon, a live late-night television sports chat and entertainment show that often ran for three or more hours. In 1997, he founded the 365 Corporation, best known for the UK football website, Football365.

In 2006, he helped launch Videojugs, a video up/download service that seeks to demonstrate all human knowledge on film. He also launched The Times newspaper's first weekly podcast, The Game. He presented a radio sports show on BBC London and hosted a weekly football podcast with Danny Baker. The football podcast ended in December 2007. Kelly has appeared in two films: Divorcing Jack and The Football Factory.

Kelly spent a period of time commencing December 2007 as stand-in presenter for Hawksbee & Jacobs, Evening Kick Off and George Galloway on Talksport radio. He joined the station to front Lets kick the ball during Euro 2008 between 19:00 and 22:00 (BST/GMT) every weekday. Kelly signed a permanent contract in August 2008 with Talksport to front the same slot during the regular football season.

On 8 January 2011, Kelly allegedly referred to Rafael Benitez as a "nonce" live on air during a radio broadcast while criticising the performance of Liverpool. Media regulator Ofcom received 130 complaints about the comments.

After several seasons presenting The Full Time Phone-In on Saturday nights up to 2020, and hosting a Sunday evening show with ex-Crystal Palace owner Simon Jordan, he also presented a Monday evening show called the PressBox, where he and the football editor of The Sun, Shaun Custis, were joined by a studio guest "to pick apart the stories that have been filling our back pages". He hosted Trans-Europe Express on Sunday nights, a programme featuring European football, as well as standing in on various shows across the talkSPORT schedule.

In 2013, Kelly and Danny Baker were announced as part of BT Sport's football coverage, hosting a Friday evening show.

From August 2021 until March 2026, Kelly presented a Tottenham Hotspur podcast, The View From The Lane, on the sports website The Athletic.

== Personal life and death ==
His long-term partner was the journalist Alex Clark. They relocated to Kilkenny, Ireland, in 2018, from where Kelly often broadcast remotely during the COVID pandemic. They married in 2021.

=== Illness and death ===
On 18 March 2026, he announced to his TalkSport viewers he had been diagnosed with oesophageal cancer and would be taking a period of absence from the show.

During the White & Jordan Show on talkSPORT on 11 November 2026 it was announced that Kelly had died the previous day, at St. James's Hospital in Dublin, aged 69.

Media offices
Preceded by Alan Lewis	Editor of the NME; 1990–1992	Succeeded by Steve Sutherland
