= Jazmine Sullivan discography =

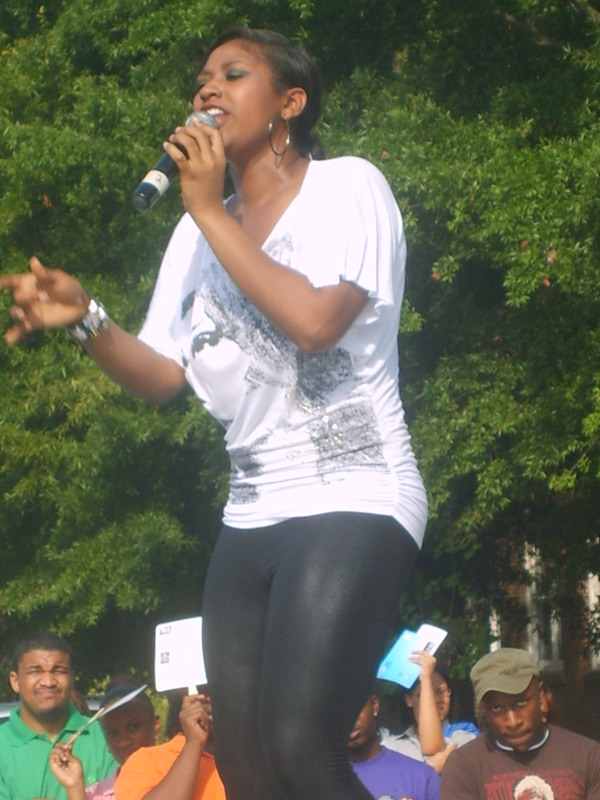
- Sullivan performing at a concert in Columbia, South Carolina, 2008
- Studio albums: 4
- Singles: 15

American singer and songwriter Jazmine Sullivan has released four studio albums and 15 singles. Sullivan signed a record deal with J Records in 2008, and released her debut album Fearless in 2008. The album was immediately certified gold by the Recording Industry Association of America while debuting at number one. Fearless has spent 12 weeks atop the Billboard Top R&B/Hip-Hop Albums since its US release. The album's first single, "Need U Bad", also reached number thirty-seven on the Billboard Hot 100 and became her first number one on the Hot R&B/Hip-Hop Songs. The second single, "Bust Your Windows", was released in September 2008 and reached the charts in the US and the UK. It also became her second top forty in the US. "Lions, Tigers & Bears" was released as the third single off the album in late 2008 and became her third top ten in the Hot R&B/Hip-Hop Songs chart in the US. In 2009, it was confirmed Jazmine would open for American singer Ne-Yo's tour. In February that same year, she released the fourth and final single, "Dream Big".

Love Me Back, Sullivan's second studio album, was released on November 29, 2010. The album reached number five on the Top R&B/Hip-Hop Albums, and her single, "Holding You Down (Goin' in Circles)", reached number sixty on the Billboard Hot 100 and was nominated for Best Female R&B Vocal Performance at the 2011 Grammy Awards Another single, "10 Seconds", reached the top twenty on the Hot R&B/Hip-Hop Songs.

Reality Show, Sullivan's third studio album, was released on January 13, 2015. "Dumb" was released as the lead single from the album on May 13, 2014, and debuted at number 45 on the R&B/Hip-Hop Airplay. The second single, "Forever Don't Last" was released on September 16, 2014, and peaked at number 10 on Adult R&B Songs, where it became her second top ten single on that chart.

== Albums ==
=== Studio albums ===
List of albums, with selected chart positions and sales figures
Title	Album details	Peak chart positions						Sales	Certifications
Title	Album details	US	US R&B /HH	US R&B	FRA	UK	UK R&B	Sales	Certifications
Fearless	Released: September 23, 2008; Label: J; Formats: CD, digital download, streaming	6	1	*	95	—	22	US: 1,000,000	RIAA: Platinum
Love Me Back	Released: November 30, 2010; Label: J; Formats: CD, digital download, streaming	17	5	*	—	—	—	US: 442,000	
Reality Show	Released: January 13, 2015; Label: RCA; Formats: CD, digital download, streaming	12	2	1	—	—	20	US: 250,000	
Heaux Tales	Released: January 8, 2021; Label: RCA; Formats: Digital download, streaming	4	2	1	—	79	9	US: 600,000	RIAA: Gold
"—" denotes a recording that did not chart or was not released in that territory.

=== Reissue albums ===
List of reissue albums, with selected information
Title	Album details
Heaux Tales, Mo' Tales: The Deluxe	Released: February 11, 2022; Label: RCA; Format: Digital download, streaming

== Singles ==
=== As lead artist ===
List of singles, with selected chart positions
Single	Year	Peak chart positions							Certifications	Album
Single	Year	US	US R&B /HH	GRE	NZ Hot	TUR	UK	UK R&B	Certifications	Album
"Need U Bad"	2008	37	1	—	—	—	—	—	RIAA: Platinum	Fearless
"Bust Your Windows"	2008	31	4	—	—	—	63	15	RIAA: 2× Platinum; BPI: Silver; RMNZ: Platinum	Fearless
"Lions, Tigers & Bears"	2008	74	10	—	—	—	—	—	RIAA: Gold	Fearless
"Dream Big"	2009	—	—	40	—	6	164	—		Fearless
"Holding You Down (Goin' in Circles)"	2010	60	3	—	—	—	—	—	RIAA: Gold	Love Me Back
"10 Seconds"	2010	— (Note: "10 Seconds" did not enter the Billboard Hot 100, but peaked at number six on the Bubbling Under Hot 100 Singles chart.)	15	—	—	—	—	—	RIAA: Gold	Love Me Back
"Excuse Me"	2011	—	71	—	—	—	—	—		Love Me Back
"Dumb" (featuring Meek Mill)	2014	—	— (Note: "Dumb" did not enter the Hot R&B/Hip-Hop Songs chart but peaked at number 45 on the R&B/Hip-Hop Airplay chart.)	—	—	—	—	—		Reality Show
"Forever Don't Last"	2014	—	— (Note: "Forever Don't Last" did not enter the Hot R&B/Hip-Hop Songs chart but peaked at number 37 on the R&B/Hip-Hop Airplay chart.)	—	—	—	—	—		Reality Show
"Let It Burn"	2015	—	— (Note: "Let It Burn" did not enter the Hot R&B/Hip-Hop Songs chart but peaked at number 30 on the R&B/Hip-Hop Airplay chart.)	—	—	—	—	—	RIAA: Platinum	Reality Show
"Insecure" (with Bryson Tiller)	2017	—	— (Note: "Insecure" did not enter the Hot R&B/Hip-Hop Songs chart but peaked at number 46 on the R&B/Hip-Hop Airplay chart.)	—	—	—	—	—	RIAA: 2× Platinum	Insecure (OST)
"Lost One"	2020	—	— (Note: "Lost One" did not enter the Hot R&B/Hip-Hop Songs chart, but peaked at number 9 on the Hot R&B Songs chart.)	—	—	—	—	—	RIAA: Gold	Heaux Tales
"Pick Up Your Feelings"	2020	75	27	—	33	—	—	—	RIAA: 2× Platinum; RMNZ: Gold	Heaux Tales
"Girl like Me" (featuring H.E.R.)	2021	97	29	—	27	—	—	—	RIAA: Platinum	Heaux Tales
"Hurt Me So Good"	2022	—	— (Note: "Hurt Me So Good" did not enter the Hot R&B/Hip-Hop Songs chart but peaked at number 22 on the R&B/Hip-Hop Airplay chart.)	—	33	—	—	—	RMNZ: Gold	Heaux Tales
"—" denotes items which were not released in that country or failed to chart. "*" indicates chart did not exist at the time of the song's release.

=== Promotional singles ===
Title	Year	Album
"Tragic"	2021	Heaux Tales, Mo Tales: The Deluxe

=== As featured artist ===
List of singles, with selected chart positions
Title	Year	Peak chart positions		Album
Title	Year	US Bub.	US R&B/HH	Album
"Champion" (Ace Hood featuring Rick Ross and Jazmine Sullivan)	2009	—	58	Ruthless
"World Tour" (Wale featuring Jazmine Sullivan)	2009	—	—	Attention Deficit
"Meditation" (GoldLink featuring Jazmine Sullivan and Kaytranada)	2017	—	—	At What Cost
"Sideline" (Niia featuring Jazmine Sullivan)	2017	—	—	I
"Hard to Believe" (Kindness featuring Jazmine Sullivan)	2019	—	—	Something Like a War
"Outlawz" (Rick Ross featuring Jazmine Sullivan and 21 Savage)	2021	13	35	Richer Than I Ever Been
"'Round Midnight" (Adam Blackstone featuring Jazmine Sullivan)	2022	—	—	Legacy
"—" denotes items which were not released in that country or failed to chart.

== Other charted songs ==
List of songs, with selected chart positions
Title	Year	Peak chart positions			Certifications	Album
Title	Year	US Bub.	US R&B /HH	US Holiday Dig.	Certifications	Album
"In Love With Another Man"	2008	—	37	—	RIAA: Gold	Fearless
"Joyful, Joyful" (Pentatonix featuring Jazmine Sullivan)	2019	—	—	5		The Best of Pentatonix Christmas
"Bodies" (Intro)	2021	—	— (Note: "Bodies (Intro)" did not enter the Hot R&B/Hip-Hop Songs chart, but peaked at number 19 on the Hot R&B Songs chart.)	—		Heaux Tales
"Put It Down"	2021	—	— (Note: "Put It Down" did not enter the Hot R&B/Hip-Hop Songs chart, but peaked at number 17 on the Hot R&B Songs chart.)	—		Heaux Tales
"On It" (featuring Ari Lennox)	2021	7	40	—	RIAA: Platinum	Heaux Tales
"Price Tags" (featuring Anderson .Paak)	2021	—	— (Note: "Price Tags" did not enter the Hot R&B/Hip-Hop Songs chart, but peaked at number 24 on the Hot R&B Songs chart.)	—		Heaux Tales
"Roster"	2022	—	— (Note: "Roster" did not enter the Hot R&B/Hip-Hop Songs chart, but peaked at number 20 on the Hot R&B Songs chart.)	—		Heaux Tales, Mo Tales: The Deluxe
"—" denotes a recording that did not chart

== Guest appearances ==
List of non-single guest appearances, showing other artist(s), year released and album name
Title	Year	Other artist(s)	Album
"I Am"	2004	Kindred the Family Soul	Surrender to Love
"Selfish" (I Want You to Myself)"	2004	Fantasia, Missy Elliott	Free Yourself
"Different Languages"	2009	Snoop Dogg	Malice N Wonderland
"Million Dolla Baby"	2009	Robin Thicke	Sex Therapy
"Champion"	2009	Ace Hood, Rick Ross	Ruthless
"World Tour"	2009	Wale	Attention Deficit
"Gonna Make It"	2009	Mary J. Blige	Stronger With Each Tear
"Dying In Your Arms"	2010	T.I.	No Mercy
"Cocaine"	2011	Eminem	None
"Dying In Your Arms"	2012	Shaggy	None
"Choose Up"	2012	Jah Cure	World Cry
"You're My Everything"	2013	Robert Glasper, Bilal	Black Radio 2
"Alabama"	2016	Frank Ocean, Sampha	Endless
"Wither"	2016	Frank Ocean	Endless
"Hublots"	2016	Frank Ocean	Endless
"Rushes"	2016	Frank Ocean	Endless
"Solo"	2016	Frank Ocean	Blonde
"Sideline"	2017	Niia	I
"Loved By You"	2017	Mali Music	The Transition of Mali
"Built for Love"	2019	PJ Morton	Paul
"Good Heels"	2019	Anderson .Paak	Ventura
"Joyful, Joyful"	2019	Pentatonix	The Best of Pentatonix Christmas
"Summer Rain"	2021	Leon Bridges	Gold-Diggers Sound (Deluxe Edition)
"Our Love"	2021	Curtis Harding	Arcane League of Legends (soundtrack)
"Sometimes I Feel Like a Motherless Child"	2022	None	Elvis (soundtrack)
"Love"	2022	John Legend	Legend
"Need Somebody"	2023	Diddy	The Love Album: Off the Grid
"Bad for You"	2024	Wizkid	Morayo
"Speed of Love"	2025	Chance the Rapper	Star Line

== Songwriting credits ==
Title	Year	Performing artist(s)	Album
"Say I" (ft. Young Jeezy)	2006	Christina Milian	So Amazin'
"Twisted"	2006	Christina Milian	So Amazin'
"I'm His Only Woman"	2008	Jennifer Hudson	Jennifer Hudson
"Everything to Me"	2010	Monica	Still Standing
"If You Were My Man"	2010	Monica	Still Standing
"I Don't Know Why, But I Do"	2010	Chrisette Michele	Let Freedom Reign
"Anything to Find You"	2012	Monica	New Life
"Cry"	2012	Monica	New Life
"Until It's Gone"	2012	Monica	New Life
"Still Love You"	2012	Tamia	Beautiful Surprise
"Now or Never"	2012	Kendrick Lamar	good kid, m.A.A.d city
"Drive By"	2013	Jessica Sanchez	Me, You & the Music
"Cried"	2014	Candice Glover	Music Speaks
"I Want You"	2014	Mary J. Blige	Think Like a Man Too
"He Is"	2014	Faith Evans	Incomparable
"Thick of It"	2017	Mary J. Blige	Strength of a Woman
"Set Me Free"	2017	Mary J. Blige	Strength of a Woman
"Thank You"	2017	Mary J. Blige	Strength of a Woman
"Glow Up" (ft. DJ Khaled, Missy Elliott, & Quavo)	2017	Mary J. Blige	Strength of a Woman
