= List of awards and nominations received by Jazmine Sullivan =

Jazmine Sullivan awards and nominations
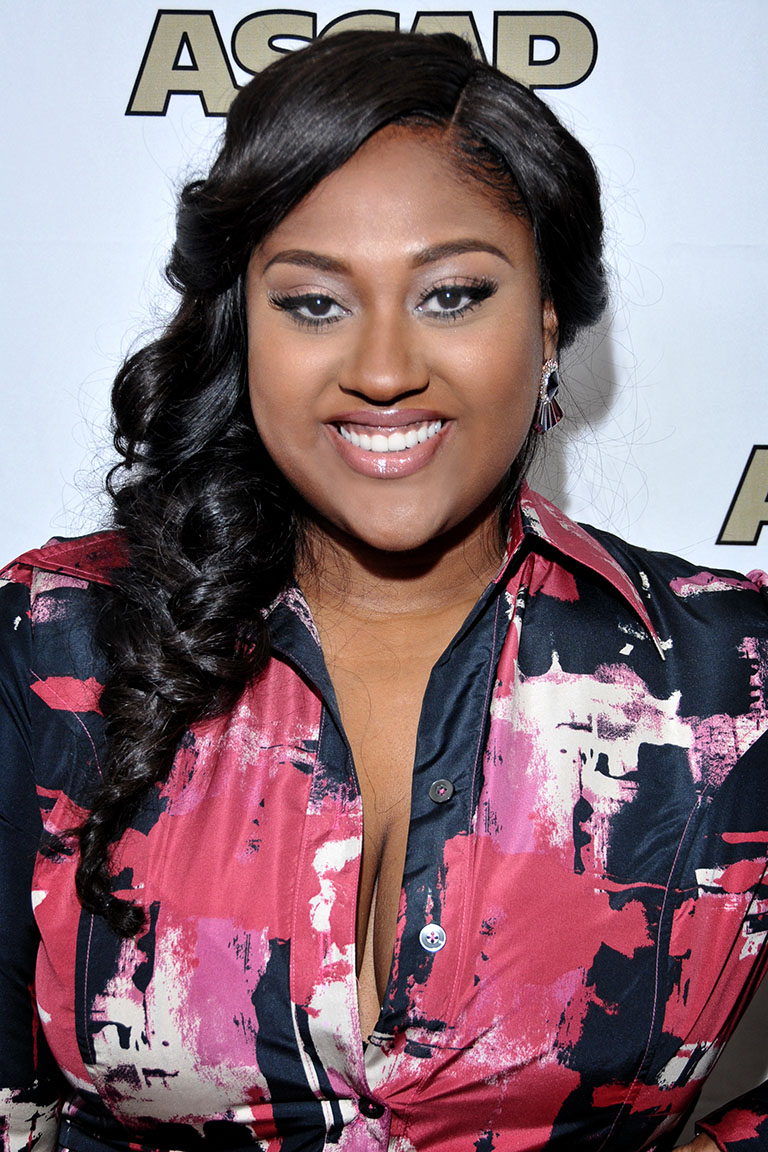
- Sullivan in 2015
Awards and nominations
Award	Wins	Nominations
American Music Awards	0	3
BET Awards	3	9
BET Hip Hop Awards	1	2
Grammy Awards	2	18
NAACP Image Awards	3	9
Soul Train Music Awards	3	10

Totals (Note: Certain award groups do not simply award one winner. They acknowledge several different recipients, have runners-up, and have third place. Since this is a specific recognition and is different from losing an award, runner-up mentions are considered wins in this award tally. For simplification and to avoid errors, each award in this list has been presumed to have had a prior nomination.)
- Wins: 15
- Nominations: 63

This is a list of awards and nominations received by Jazmine Sullivan, an American singer and songwriter.

Throughout her career, Sullivan has received widespread recognition for her contributions to R&B music, earning numerous awards and nominations from major music organizations. In 2010, she received the Billboard Women in Music Rising Star Award, becoming the second recipient of the honor. She has since earned 18 Grammy Award nominations, winning Best R&B Performance for "Pick Up Your Feelings" and Best R&B Album for Heaux Tales at the 64th Annual Grammy Awards in 2022, the former tying with Silk Sonic's "Leave the Door Open".

Sullivan has also received four BET Awards, including Album of the Year for Heaux Tales (2021) and Best Female R&B Artist (2022), three NAACP Image Awards, including Outstanding Female Artist, Outstanding Album for Heaux Tales, and Outstanding Soul/R&B Song for "Pick Up Your Feelings", and three Soul Train Music Awards, including Album of the Year for Heaux Tales and Best R&B/Soul Female Artist in 2021 and 2022. In 2021, she also received three nominations at the American Music Awards for Favorite Soul/R&B Female Artist, Favorite Soul/R&B Album, and Favorite Soul/R&B Song. In 2023, her song "Stand Up", recorded for the film Till, was shortlisted for the Academy Award for Best Original Song.

== Awards and nominations ==
List of award nominations, with the year of ceremony, nominee or work, category, and result
Award	Year	Category	Nominee/Work	Result	Ref.
Academy Awards	2023	Best Original Song	"Stand Up"	Shortlisted	
American Music Awards	2021	Favorite Soul/R&B Female Artist	Herself	Nominated	
American Music Awards	2021	Favorite Soul/R&B Album	Heaux Tales	Nominated	
American Music Awards	2021	Favorite Soul/R&B Song	"Pick Up Your Feelings"	Nominated	
Best of R&B Awards	2015	Best Female Artist	Herself	Nominated	
Best of R&B Awards	2015	Best Album	Reality Show	Nominated	
Best of R&B Awards	2015	Best R&B/Soul Single	"Let It Burn"	Nominated	
BET Awards	2009	Best Female R&B Artist	Herself	Nominated	
BET Awards	2009	Best New Artist	Herself	Nominated	
BET Awards	2009	J Award	Herself	Won	
BET Awards	2015	Centric Award	"Dumb"	Nominated	
BET Awards	2021	Album of the Year	Heaux Tales	Won	
BET Awards	2021	Best Female R&B Artist	Herself	Nominated	
BET Awards	2022	Album of the Year	Heaux Tales, Mo' Tales: The Deluxe	Nominated	
BET Awards	2022	BET Her Award	"Roster"	Nominated	
BET Awards	2022	Best Female R&B Artist	Herself	Won	
Billboard Women in Music	2010	Rising Star Award	Herself	Won	
Grammy Awards	2009	Best New Artist	Herself	Nominated	
Grammy Awards	2009	Best Female R&B Vocal Performance	"Need U Bad"	Nominated	
Grammy Awards	2009	Best Traditional R&B Performance	"In Love with Another Man"	Nominated	
Grammy Awards	2009	Best R&B Song	"Bust Your Windows"	Nominated	
Grammy Awards	2009	Best Contemporary R&B Album	Fearless	Nominated	
Grammy Awards	2010	Best Female R&B Vocal Performance	"Lions, Tigers & Bears"	Nominated	
Grammy Awards	2010	Best R&B Song	"Lions, Tigers & Bears"	Nominated	
Grammy Awards	2011	Best Female R&B Vocal Performance	"Holding You Down (Goin' in Circles)"	Nominated	
Grammy Awards	2016	Best Traditional R&B Performance	"Let It Burn"	Nominated	
Grammy Awards	2016	Best R&B Song	"Let It Burn"	Nominated	
Grammy Awards	2016	Best R&B Album	Reality Show	Nominated	
Grammy Awards	2020	Best Traditional R&B Performance	"Built for Love" (with PJ Morton)	Nominated	
Grammy Awards	2022	Best R&B Performance	"Pick Up Your Feelings"	Won (Note: Tied with Silk Sonic for "Leave the Door Open".)	
Grammy Awards	2022	Best R&B Song	"Pick Up Your Feelings"	Nominated	
Grammy Awards	2022	Best R&B Album	Heaux Tales	Won	
Grammy Awards	2023	Best R&B Performance	"Hurt Me So Good"	Nominated	
Grammy Awards	2023	Best R&B Song	"Hurt Me So Good"	Nominated	
Grammy Awards	2023	Best Traditional R&B Performance	"'Round Midnight" (with Adam Blackstone)	Nominated	
NAACP Image Awards	2009	Outstanding New Artist	Herself	Nominated	
NAACP Image Awards	2016	Outstanding Female Artist	Herself	Nominated	
NAACP Image Awards	2016	Outstanding Song	"Let It Burn"	Nominated	
NAACP Image Awards	2018	Outstanding Song	"Insecure"	Nominated	
NAACP Image Awards	2021	Outstanding Female Artist	Herself	Nominated	
NAACP Image Awards	2022	Outstanding Female Artist	Herself	Won	
NAACP Image Awards	2022	Outstanding Album	Heaux Tales	Won	
NAACP Image Awards	2022	Outstanding Duo, Group or Collaboration (Traditional)	"Girl like Me" (featuring H.E.R.)	Nominated	
NAACP Image Awards	2022	Outstanding Soul/R&B Song	"Pick Up Your Feelings”	Won	
Soul Train Music Awards	2009	Best New Artist	Herself	Nominated	
Soul Train Music Awards	2017	Best Collaboration	"Insecure" (with Bryson Tiller)	Nominated	
Soul Train Music Awards	2021	Song of the Year	"Pick Up Your Feelings"	Nominated	
Soul Train Music Awards	2021	Video of the Year	"Pick Up Your Feelings"	Nominated	
Soul Train Music Awards	2021	The Ashford and Simpson Songwriter of the Year Award	"Pick Up Your Feelings"	Nominated	
Soul Train Music Awards	2021	Best Collaboration	"Girl like Me" (featuring H.E.R.)	Nominated	
Soul Train Music Awards	2021	Best R&B/Soul Female Artist	Herself	Won	
Soul Train Music Awards	2021	Album of the Year	Heaux Tales	Won	
Soul Train Music Awards	2022	Album of the Year	"Heaux Tales, Mo' Tales: The Deluxe"	Nominated	
Soul Train Music Awards	2022	Best R&B/Soul Female Artist	Herself	Won	
UB Honors	2017	Best Mid-tempo Single of the Year	"Insecure"	Won	
UB Honors	2019	Favorite Up/Mid -Tempo Single of the Decade	"Holding You Down (Goin' in Circles)"	Won	
UB Honors	2019	Favorite Ballad of the Decade	"10 Seconds"	Won	
UB Honors	2021	Best R&B Female Artist	Herself	Nominated	
UB Honors	2021	Best R&B Ballad of the Year	"Pick Up Your Feelings"	Nominated	
UB Honors	2021	Best R&B Single of the Year	"Pick Up Your Feelings"	Nominated	
UB Honors	2021	Best R&B Album of the Year	Heaux Tales	Nominated	
UB Honors	2021	Hustler of the Year	Herself	Nominated	
UB Honors	2021	Artist of the Year	Herself	Nominated	
