= The War Room with Quinn and Rose =

American conservative talk radio program

Quinn and Rose was a syndicated conservative talk radio program hosted by Jim Quinn and Rose Somma Tennent. Broadcasting from Pittsburgh, Pennsylvania, the show aired in limited syndication from flagship station WPGB-HD2/WBGG in Pittsburgh during the morning drive time slot.

Prior to 2013, the program aired on WPGB's main channel as its morning drive show and was syndicated to several affiliates, mostly in the northeastern United States. The series was abruptly canceled after the November 15, 2013 broadcast, with Clear Channel citing an inability to reach a contract extension, later suggestions indicating that Clear Channel budget cuts were at fault, and the show's affiliates claiming the duo was fired. (The contract dispute appears to pertain directly to Quinn, as Rose remained a fill-in host for Clear Channel as of January 2014.) Flagship station WPGB changed formats nine months after Quinn's firing; there has been speculation that WJAS, which picked up most of WPGB's lineup, would revive the program. A major hangup in negotiations was that Quinn insists on retaining all rights to the Internet stream. Quinn would eventually return to radio, but without Rose, in March 2015. Rose, in turn, would pick up her own show on WPGP (AM 1250), in late May of the same year. Both Quinn's and Rose's programs were carried by WYSL.

In September 2018, Quinn and Rose agreed to reunite on WBGG, which otherwise operates as a sports talk station. Quinn's existing program, carried on WYSL, will continue. WBGG's Web site makes no mention of airing the program. In March 2021, Rose left to take over Rush Limbaugh's time slot on WJAS following Limbaugh's death. Quinn and Rose remained close personal friends even after they ceased hosting radio shows together.

The program was designed to appeal to political conservatives. Quinn denigrated liberals, the IRS, big government, radical environmentalists, the bias of the mainstream media, and outspoken Hollywood actors. He promoted issues such as the right to bear arms, the FairTax, Christian values, alternative media, and the military. Issues Quinn discussed from a conservative point of view include U.S. domestic politics, world affairs, science, economics, and social issues. Rose predominantly took stances on issues concerning her spiritual faith with regard to politics, religion, family values, social problems, and education. Rose was an evangelical Christian, while Quinn was mostly non-religious during the time the two were on radio together and jokingly dubbed Rose "Church Lady" for her religious beliefs.

Quinn died in March 2025. WYSL replaced Quinn's show with another show syndicated from Pittsburgh, hosted by Wendy Bell.

== "Heads-Up" themes ==
The show has a unique format in that it is, for the most part, divided into thematic "Heads-Ups" (e.g. Liberal Heads-Up, "Euro-weenie" Heads-Up, ACLU Heads-Up), each with its own theme song:

- Education/University Heads-up: "Another Brick in the Wall" by Pink Floyd
- ACLU Heads-Up: "Losing My Religion" by R.E.M.
- Gay Heads-Up: "YMCA" by The Village People
- Immigration Heads-Up: "Illegal Alien" by Genesis
- Liberal Heads-Up: "Love Me, I'm a Liberal" by Jello Biafra and Mojo Nixon
- Media Heads-Up: "Dirty Laundry" by Don Henley
- Clinton Legacy Heads-Up: "Here's a Quarter (Call Someone Who Cares)" by Travis Tritt
- Hillary Clinton Heads-Up: "How Can I Miss You When You Won't Go Away?" by Dan Hicks (singer)
- Racial Heads-Up: "Black or White" by Michael Jackson
- Union Heads-Up: "Bang on The Drum All Day" by Todd Rundgren
- Gun Heads-Up: "Lock and Load" by Bob Seger
- School Heads-Up: "School Days" by Chuck Berry
- Ted Kennedy Heads-Up: "Drive My Car" by The Beatles
- Victim Heads-Up: "Get Over It" by Eagles
- Insane Item of the Day, "Moonbat" Heads-Up: "They're Coming to Take Me Away" by Napoleon XIV
- Harry Reid Heads-Up: "Pinky and the Brain" theme
- John Kerry Heads-Up: "Flipper" Theme
- Bush Heads-Up: "Bush Was Right" by The Right Brothers
- Iran Heads-Up: "Bomb Iran" by Vince Vance & The Valiants
- Iraq Heads-Up: "I'm Free" by The Who
- Hate mail: "Everything About You" by Ugly Kid Joe
- France Heads-Up: "Surrender to Love" by Kindred the Family Soul
- San Francisco Heads-Up: "San Francisco" by Scott McKenzie
- Democrat Heads-Up: "Surrender to Love" by Kindred the Family Soul/"It's My Party and I'll Cry If I Want To" by Lesley Gore
- America Heads-Up: "Living in America" by James Brown
- Animal rights Heads-Up: "Wabbit Slayer" by Ozzy Fudd
- Government Heads-Up: "For What It's Worth" by Buffalo Springfield
- Euro-Weenie Heads-Up: "Springtime for Hitler" from The Producers soundtrack
- Greeny-Weenie Heads-Up: "Bein' Green" by Kermit the Frog
- New World Order Heads-Up: "Bidding America Goodbye (The Auction)" by Tanya Tucker
- Peacenik/Cindy Sheehan Heads-Up: "I'd Like to Teach the World to Sing" by The New Seekers
- Sexual harassment Heads-Up: "He Touched Me" by Barbra Streisand
- Venezuela Heads-Up: "Hot Hot Hot" by Buster Poindexter
- Death penalty Heads-Up: "Shock The Monkey" by Peter Gabriel
- Barack Obama Heads-Up: "Bad Company" by Bad Company, "Who Are You" by The Who or "I Wanna Talk About Me" by Toby Keith
- Welfare Heads-up: "Free Ride" by Edgar Winter
- Sarah Palin Heads-up: "I'm a Woman" by Peggy Lee
- Scott Brown Heads-up: "Pickup Man" by Joe Diffie
- Michigan Heads-up: "Foolish Pride" by Travis Tritt
- Ozone Al Heads-Up: "Lost In The Ozone" by Commander Cody and his Lost Planet Airmen
- Dzhokhar Tsarnaev Heads-up: "Come on Down to My Boat" by Every Mother's Son

The usual bumper music is "Monster" by Steppenwolf, "Eminence Front" by The Who, "Stranglehold" by Ted Nugent, "Cradle Will Rock" by Van Halen, "La Grange" by ZZ Top, "Soul Shaker", "Save a Horse (Ride a Cowboy)" by Big and Rich, and "Panama" by Van Halen, American Radio by Carolina Rain and (on Fridays at the top of the hour) "Working for the Weekend" by Loverboy.

== Affiliates ==
Starting in Pittsburgh, the show was syndicated mainly through the eastern United States. At its peak the show had eighteen affiliates, many of which paired the show with Clear Channel's existing conservative talk network (which does not have a morning drive program of its own). Most affiliates replaced the show with local programming, while other FM affiliates went to music formats. The show originated from WPGB.

The show was carried on XM Satellite Radio via "America's Talk" with the last show being carried on October 17, 2013, when Clear Channel pulled its programming off the XM platform.

Calls	Freq.	Branding	Format	Market/Market Rank	Timeslot	Group Owner
WPGB	104.7 MHz	FM NewsTalk 104.7	News/Talk	Pittsburgh, PA / 24	Live 6A-10A	Clear Channel Communications
WYSL	1040 kHz	News Power 1040 WYSL	News/Talk	Avon-Rochester, New York / 54	Live 6A-9A	Radio Livingston
W221CL	92.1 MHz	News Power 1040 WYSL	News/Talk	Avon-Rochester, New York / 54	Live 6A-9A	Radio Livingston
WHLO	640 kHz	Akron's News Talk 640 WHLO	News/Talk	Akron, OH / 73	Tape 9A-12P	Clear Channel Communications
WICO-FM	92.5 MHz	Delmarva's Talk Stations	News/Talk	Salisbury-Ocean City, MD / 141	Live 6A-9A	Delmarva Broadcasting Company
WVTT	96.7 MHz	NewsRadio 96.7 WVTT	News/Talk	Portville-Olean, NY / 200+	Live 6A-9A	Colonial Radio Group; Format later moved to Standard Media-owned WGGO without Quinn
WFRB	560 kHz		Talk	Cumberland, MD / NM	Live 6A-9A	WTBO-WKGO Corporation, L.L.C.
WNCO	1450 kHz	WNCO 1340 AM	News/Talk	Ashland/Mansfield, OH / NM	Live 6A-9A	Clear Channel Communications

- Show is streamed via the internet.
