= Excuse Me (Jazmine Sullivan song) =

Single by Jazmine Sullivan

from the album Love Me Back
- Released: March 25, 2011
- Recorded: 2009-2010
- Genre: R&B ballad, soul, smooth jazz, drum and bass
- Length: 3:33
- Label: J
- Songwriters: Cainon Lamb: Missy Elliott; Richard Germinaro; Ben Weisman; Evie Sands; Jazmine Sullivan
- Producers: Missy Elliott; Lamb (co.)

Jazmine Sullivan singles chronology
"10 Seconds" (2010)	"Excuse Me" (2011)	"Dumb" (2014)

"Excuse Me" is a song by American singer Jazmine Sullivan. It was written by Sullivan, Cainon Lamb, and Missy Elliott for her second studio album, Love Me Back (2010), while production helmed by the latter, with Lamb credited as co-producer. The song contains a sample from "Take It or Leave It" by American R&B vocal group The Manhattans. Due to the inclusion of the sample, Ben Weisman and Richard Germinaro are credited as songwriters. "Excuse Me" was released by J Records in 2011 as the album's third single and reached number 71 on the US Hot R&B/Hip-Hop Songs.

== Credits and personnel ==
Credits adapted from the album's liner notes.

- Missy Elliott – producer, writer
- Paul J. Falcone – engineer
- Cainon Lamb – co-producer, drum programming, writer
- Jazmine Sullivan – vocals, writer

== Charts ==
Chart (2011)	Peak position
US Hot R&B/Hip-Hop Songs (Billboard)	71
