= Love Has No Recession =

Studio album by Kindred the Family Soul
- Released: July 26, 2011
- Recorded: 2009–2011
- Genre: Neo soul
- Length: 52:12
- Label: Shanachie Records
- Producer: Dre & Vidal, Tremaine Williams, Hezekiah Davis, Stevie McKie & Adam Blackstone, Anthony Bell, Damon Bennett, DeAndre "Dre King" Shaifer, Kindred the Family Soul

Kindred the Family Soul chronology
The Arrival (2008)	Love Has No Recession (2011)

Love Has No Recession is the fourth studio album by American neo soul group Kindred the Family Soul. It was released on July 26, 2011 by Shanachie Records.

== Singles ==
- "Magic Happens" was the first single from Love Has No Recession, and was released online on April 28, 2011. It was officially released on June 1 by Shanachie Entertainment.

== Release and promotion ==
The album was released on July 26, 2011 by Shanachie Entertainment. It peaked at #90 on the Billboard 200.

== Track listing ==
1. "The Sheddington (Intro)"
2. "Above the Water, Part 1" (featuring Ursula Rucker)
3. "We All Will Know" (featuring Raheem DeVaughn)
4. "Take a Look Around" (featuring BJ the Chicago Kid and Bilal)
5. "You Got Love" (featuring Snoop Dogg)
6. "Magic Happen"
7. "Authentically You" (featuring Lady Alma Horton)
8. "Above Water, Part 2" (featuring CoCo Brown)
9. "SOS (Sense of Security)"
10. "Sticking with You"
11. "2 Words"
12. "Going to the Go-Go" (featuring Chuck Brown and DJ Kool)
13. "Love Has No Recession" (featuring Frederic Yonnet)
14. "Above the Water, Part 3" (featuring Rich Medina)
15. "The Sheddington (Outro)/Rain (Skit)"
16. "You Got Love Remix" (featuring Snoop Dogg) (Bonus Track)

== Chart performance ==
Chart (2011)	Peak position
Billboard 200	90
Top R&B/Hip-Hop Albums	19
