= Jazmine Sullivan =

American singer (born 1987)

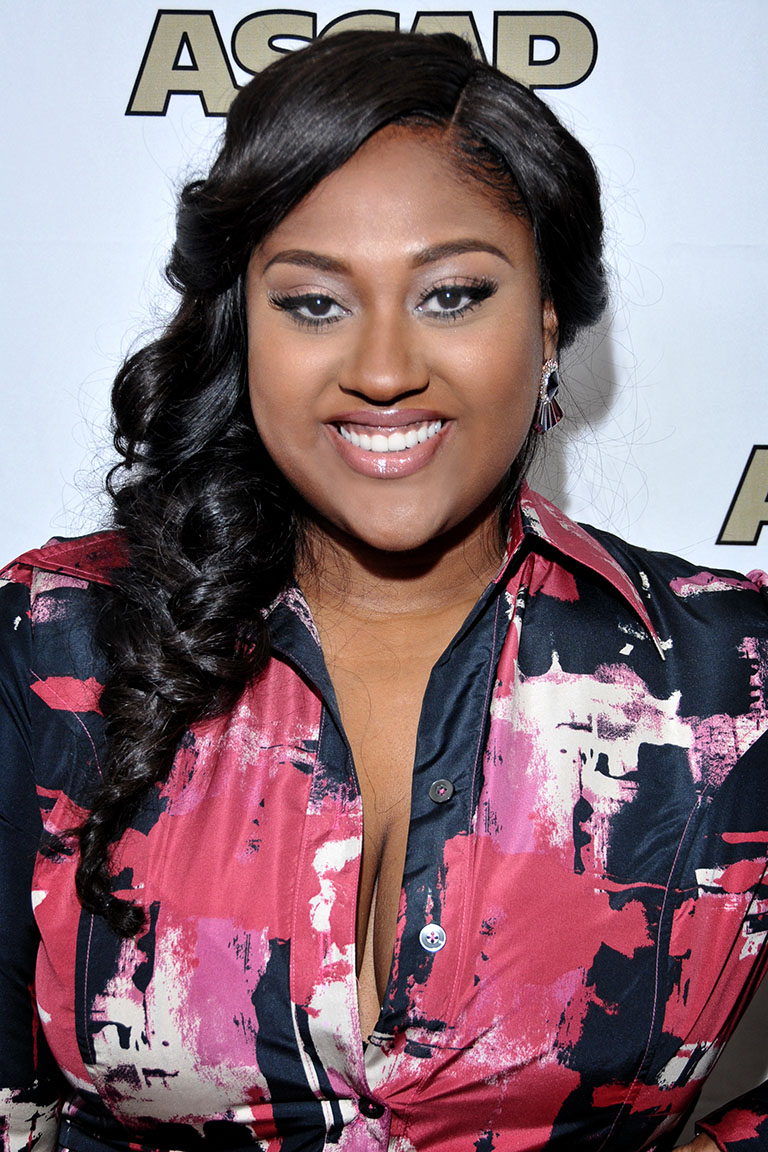
- Sullivan in 2015

Background information
- Born: Jazmine Marie Sullivan; April 9, 1987 (age 39); Philadelphia, Pennsylvania, U.S.
- Genres: R&B; neo soul
- Occupations: Singer; songwriter
- Works: Discography
- Years active: 2003–present
- Labels: RCA; J; Arista
- Awards: Full list
- Website: jazminesullivanmusic.com

Jazmine Marie Sullivan (born April 9, 1987) is an American singer and songwriter. She has received numerous accolades throughout her career, including two Grammy Awards from multiple nominations, a Billboard Women in Music Award, two BET Awards, and multiple NAACP Image Awards.

Born and raised in Philadelphia, Sullivan signed with J Records and released her debut studio album, Fearless, in 2008. The album debuted within the top ten of the US Billboard 200, topped the US Top R&B/Hip-Hop Albums chart, and was certified platinum by the Recording Industry Association of America (RIAA). Its singles, "Need U Bad" and "Bust Your Windows", became commercial successes, with the former reaching number one on the US Hot R&B/Hip-Hop Songs chart. Sullivan followed with Love Me Back (2010), before taking a hiatus from music. She returned in 2015 with Reality Show, which received widespread critical acclaim and earned three Grammy Award nominations.

Sullivan's fourth studio album, Heaux Tales (2021), debuted at number four on the Billboard 200 and received widespread critical acclaim. The project won the Grammy Award for Best R&B Album, while its singles, including "Pick Up Your Feelings" and "Girl like Me", received platinum certifications from the RIAA. Heaux Tales was expanded as Heaux Tales, Mo' Tales: The Deluxe in 2022, and Sullivan supported the project with The Heaux Tales Tour before performing "The Star-Spangled Banner" at Super Bowl LVII in 2023.

== Life and career ==
=== 1987–2007: Early life and career beginnings ===
Jazmine Marie Sullivan was born in Philadelphia, Pennsylvania on April 9, 1987 to Don and Pam Sullivan. Her mother was a former backup singer for Philadelphia International Records. When she was five years old, her father landed a position as a curator for the city's Historic Strawberry Mansion in the Strawberry Mansion section of Philadelphia, and her family moved into the historical landmark.

Sullivan is a 2005 graduate of the Philadelphia High School for the Creative and Performing Arts where she was a vocal music major. Sullivan began singing as a contralto in the children's choir, and later in the adult choir. Sullivan's exposure to secular music was initially limited.

At fifteen, Sullivan signed to Jive Records. She recorded an album, which was never released, and she was eventually dropped from the label. Sullivan provided vocals for Kindred the Family Soul's song "I Am", as well as background vocals on the song "Party's Over", and the title track to their 2003 debut, Surrender to Love. She first met rapper Missy Elliott during the session; Elliott went on to produce both the majority of her debut album, Fearless, and tracks on Love Me Back. Sullivan wrote and recorded with producers Cool & Dre a song titled "Say I"; it was given to Dre's then-girlfriend Christina Milian for her third album, So Amazin'. The song became the lead single, peaking at number 13 on the Hot R&B/Hip-Hop Songs as well as reaching number 21 on the Hot 100 chart.

=== 2008–2009: Fearless ===
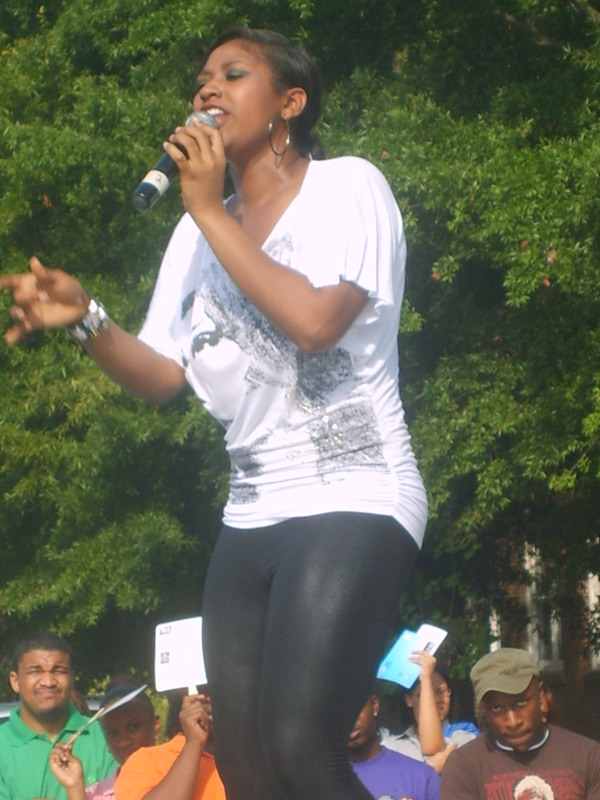
Sullivan performing live at a concert in Columbia, South Carolina in 2008.

Sullivan's debut single, "Need U Bad", was released in May 2008. The song, featuring additional vocals by Missy Elliott and Sandy "Pepa" Denton of Salt-n-Pepa, later debuted at number 37 on the Billboard Hot 100, and was on top of the Hot R&B/Hip Hop Songs for 34 weeks. Sullivan's debut album, Fearless, was released on September 23, 2008. At the time, she wrote and composed many of its songs and served as the album's executive producer alongside Missy Elliott, Salaam Remi, and Peter Edge. The album received production from Elliott, Remi, Stargate, Carvin & Ivan, Jack Splash, and Fisticuffs. Fearless debuted at number 1 on the Top R&B/Hip Hop Albums and at number 6 on the Billboard 200. Sullivan followed her début single with the release of the second single from Fearless, "Bust Your Windows", which reached number 4 on the Hot R&B/Hip-Hop Songs and number 31 on the Billboard Hot 100, becoming her most successful single on that chart to date. "Bust Your Windows" appeared on the first season of the Fox hit television show Glee and was also nominated for a Grammy for Best R&B Song. In 2014, Stevie Wonder claimed he considered "Bust Your Windows" a classic song. "Lions, Tigers & Bears" was released as the album's third single in December 2008. It scored her third consecutive top ten on the Hot R&B/Hip-Hop Songs, reaching number 10, and garnered some mainstream success by reaching number 74 on the Billboard Hot 100. Sullivan later pursued success in the United Kingdom and she first released "Dream Big" as a single in the UK in February 2009. The song was released as the fourth and final single from the album in April 2009. The album has a platinum certification by the Recording Industry Association of America and has sold more than 510,000 copies in the United States.

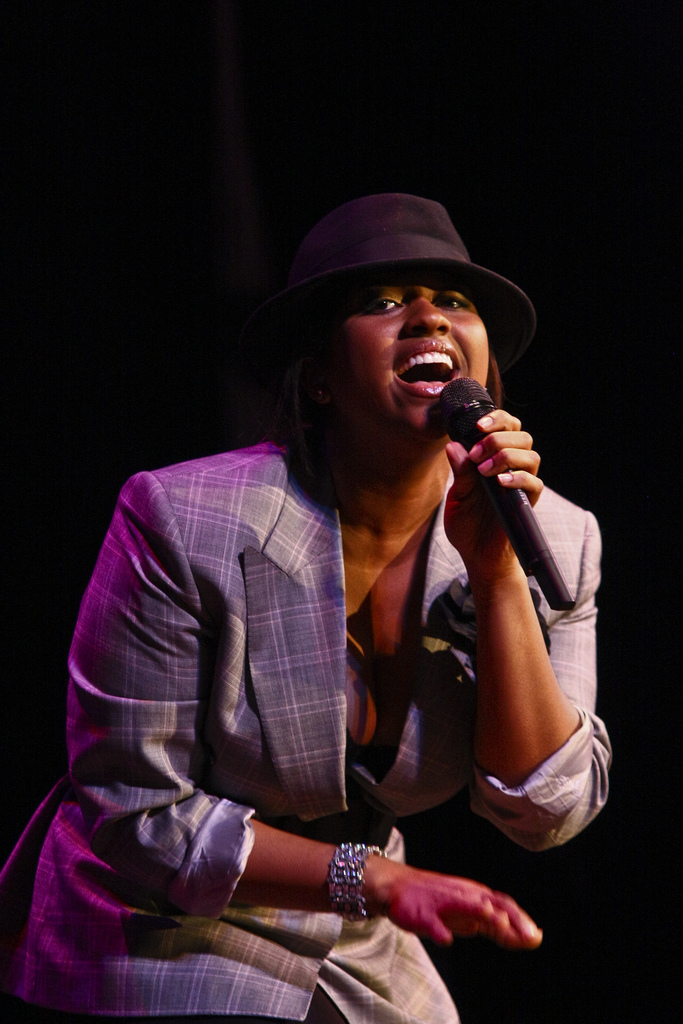
Sullivan performing live in February 2009

Sullivan was featured on a song entitled "Smoking Gun" with Jadakiss on his third studio album The Last Kiss. The song was influenced by a family friend, Devonte Wongwai, from New York City, who wanted to hear the duo on a record. She was also a supporting act for fellow American R&B singer Maxwell on his 2008 US tour and was the opening act for Ne-Yo's 2009 Year of the Gentleman Tour. She additionally appeared on Ace Hood's second studio album, Ruthless, on the song "Champion". She went on to headline a few dates with Ryan Leslie, before participating in the Essence Music Festival in June 2009. In the same year Sullivan appeared in commercials for Cotton Incorporated. Additionally Sullivan made a guest appearance on Snoop Dogg's tenth studio album, Malice n Wonderland, on the song "Different Languages".

=== 2010-2011: Love Me Back ===
Sullivan began working on her second album, Love Me Back, in 2009. Producers contributing to the album included Missy Elliott, Lamb, Ne-Yo, Anthony Bell, Los da Mystro, Ryan Leslie, and Salaam Remi, who was also a major contributor to Fearless. Songs recorded for the album include "Love You Long Time", "Don't Make Me Wait" (a tribute to Prince), "Redemption", "Excuse Me", "Good Enough", and the reported sequel to "Bust Your Windows" titled "You Get On My Nerves", which was co-written by Ne-Yo. The album was completed in June 2010 and released on November 30, 2010. The album debuted at number 17 on the Billboard 200 and sold 57,000 copies in its first week.

In an interview with National Public Radio, Sullivan explained that the album was about her personal experiences, stating:

"It's very therapeutic for me at times to just sit down and write lyrics and music, As I look at all of the songs that I've written, I see now that some of them have been a little too personal. When I was younger, I was very quick to react. 'Bust Your Windows' shows that part of me, but now I feel like I'll think about my reaction and take my time, and react 10 seconds later, I live life and it gives me the material to write for the next album."

The album's lead single, "Holding You Down (Goin' in Circles)", was released on July 10, 2010. The song debuted at number 60 on the Billboard Hot 100. The music video for the song premiered on August 30, 2010. The song would later be nominated for a Grammy Award for Best Female R&B Vocal Performance in 2011. The album's second single, "10 Seconds", was released to radio airplay in late September, and debuted at number 15 the Hot R&B/Hip-Hop Songs. The song was released for digital download on October 25, 2010. An accompanying music video was later filmed and was released on November 12, 2010.

In early December 2010, Billboard honored Sullivan as the 'Rising Star' for 2010. Later she announced that she was working on her third studio album. In January 2011, Sullivan announced via Twitter that she was indefinitely leaving the music industry, saying, "I promised myself when it wasn't fun anymore I wouldn't do it. And, here I am. I'm not saying I won't ever sing again in my life because I don't believe that. But in this moment… right now… [I] got some things to figure out". On October 7, RCA Records announced it was disbanding J Records along with Arista Records and Jive Records. With the shutdown Sullivan (along with all of the artists previously signed to the three labels) were removed from the label and later redirected to RCA, all being moved to that label's roster.

=== 2014–2019: Return to music and Reality Show ===
In 2014, Sullivan returned to music with the announcement of her new album, Reality Show. In an interview with Billboard, Sullivan described her return as inevitable, saying she "...can't escape [her] calling". She based her album Reality Show on watching reality shows during her hiatus, which inspired the namesake. The album consists of 14 songs, and features production from Key Wane and Salaam Remi. The lead single, "Dumb", featuring American rapper Meek Mill, was released on May 12, 2014. The song debuted at number 45 on the R&B/Hip-Hop Airplay. The second single, "Forever Don't Last", was released on September 16, 2014. It peaked at number 37 on the R&B/Hip-Hop Airplay chart.

On January 13, 2015, Jazmine Sullivan released Reality Show to widespread critical acclaim, with the album reaching number one on the US Billboard R&B Albums and number two on the Top R&B/Hip-Hop Albums. Reality Show sold 30,000 copies in its first week. Slant Magazine commented, "Despite what the rasp in her voice might suggest, Sullivan clearly sees herself as something other than R&B's next great queen of pain. Her central themes—love and self-image—don't stray far from genre convention, but her musical versatility and keenly observed characters make her one of the most captivating artists in R&B today." The album earned Sullivan three Grammy Award nominations, including Best R&B Album and Best Traditional R&B Performance for its third single, "Let It Burn". To further promote Reality Show, Sullivan embarked on The Reality Show Tour, her first headlining concert tour. The initial leg began on March 1 in New Orleans and visited 12 cities across the United States before concluding in Las Vegas on March 29. Following strong ticket sales and multiple sold-out performances, Sullivan announced an 18-date extension, which launched in Houston on April 2 and concluded in Silver Spring, Maryland, on April 30, with singer Jordan Bratton serving as the opening act for most dates.

On February 21, 2016, she performed the national anthem at the first game of the 2016 NHL Stadium Series at TCF Bank Stadium featuring the Chicago Blackhawks and Minnesota Wild. On August 19, Sullivan was featured in the visual album Endless by Frank Ocean. Sullivan lent her vocals to four songs from the album: "Alabama", "Wither", "Hublots", and "Rushes". On April 28, 2017, Sullivan was the lead writer for these four songs on Mary J. Blige's album Strength of a Woman, and sang backup vocals on the first three of them: "Thick of It", "Set Me Free", "Glow Up", and "Thank You." On August 4, Sullivan and fellow American singer Bryson Tiller released "Insecure" for the soundtrack for the second season of the HBO series of the same title. On October 25, 2019, Sullivan was featured on Pentatonix's Christmas collection The Best of Pentatonix Christmas on the group's cover of "Joyful, Joyful".

=== 2020–2024: Heaux Tales ===
In August 2020, Sullivan announced the release of a new song titled "Lost One", marking her return to music. Within hours of the announcement, the phrase "New Jazmine" trended on Twitter across the United States. The song was released the next day along with the confirmation of her fourth studio album. Sullivan released the second single, "Pick Up Your Feelings", on November 20.

Sullivan's fourth album, Heaux Tales was released on January 8, 2021. With first-week sales of 42,000 copies, the album debuted at number four on the US Billboard 200 chart and earning Sullivan her highest-peaking album on the chart. On February 7, she performed "The Star-Spangled Banner", alongside country artist Eric Church at Super Bowl LV. In May, she earned the first single gold certification of Heaux Tales with "Pick Up Your Feelings".

On June 24, Sullivan released "Tragic". On June 27, she performed "Tragic" at the 2021 BET Awards along with "On It" (featuring Ari Lennox). She was awarded the BET Award for Album of the Year that night. Later in 2021, she was awarded Best Album of the Year and Best R&B/Soul Female Artist at the annual Soul Train Music Awards.

On November 7, Sullivan teamed up with soul singer-songwriter Curtis Harding on the duet "Our Love", for the soundtrack of the Emmy Award-winning Netflix series Arcane. Five days later, she was featured alongside 21 Savage on Rick Ross's single "Outlawz", the lead single from his album Richer Than I Ever Been. That same day, Sullivan's recording on the ending-credit version of the song "Come to Your Senses" for the musical Tick, Tick... Boom! was released. Later that month, Sullivan announced the North American The Heaux Tales Tour in support of Heaux Tales. The tour began on February 15, 2022, in Portland, Oregon, and concluded on April 10 in Los Angeles, California, with stops across the United States and Canada. It experienced five dates postponements and three shows cancellations due to the COVID-19 pandemic.

In 2022, Sullivan earned multiple accolades: Best R&B Performance for "Pick Up Your Feelings" and Best R&B Album for Heaux Tales at the 64th Annual Grammy Awards; Outstanding Female Artist, Outstanding Album for Heaux Tales, and Outstanding Soul/R&B Song for "Pick Up Your Feelings" at the 53rd NAACP Image Awards; and Best Female R&B Artist at the BET Awards.

In March 2024, Sullivan was announced as a special guest performer on Maxwell's The Serenade Tour, a North American arena tour that ran from September through October. The following month, Sullivan announced a four-date European concert tour, which took place through July 6 to July 13.

== Artistry and public image ==
Sonically, Sullivan's voice alternates between "modern productions" and a "1980s-influenced sound" which music critics say gives her "old-school hip hop sound". Her voice type is alto. InStyle said that she has a "raspy voice". She describes her writing style as "flashbacks", in reference to her songs about failed relationships that were both physically and emotionally abusive. Her music displays her responses to these relationships famously with her song "Bust Your Windows". She likes to write about how she is feeling, which may take anywhere from a day to a month to complete. During the recording of the album Reality Show, Sullivan spent so much time revising and re-recording that the producers had to force her to release the album to prevent a delayed release. Sullivan is well known for writing her own songs, which amplifies her substantial popularity from both critics and fans.

In July 2018, Sullivan's song "Bust Your Windows" was listed at number 137 on National Public Radio's list of The 200 Greatest Songs By 21st Century Women. In May 2022, Time named her one of the world's 100 most influential people. In February 2023, Rolling Stone ranked Sullivan at number 182 on its list of the 200 Greatest Singers of All Time.

== Personal life ==
Sullivan has stated that she was in an abusive relationship with an ex-boyfriend during the early 2010s, which contributed to her decision to step away from music following the release of Love Me Back (2010). In interviews promoting Reality Show and later Heaux Tales, she said the experience affected her emotional well-being and required years of healing, later describing the project as an outlet for processing trauma and encouraging women to extend themselves grace.

On May 11, 2020, Sullivan announced that her mother, Pam, had been diagnosed with inflammatory breast cancer in October 2019. On Instagram, Sullivan wrote, "If being your daughter has taught me one thing it is how to work with something ugly, painful even, and make it a work of art". On July 24, 2023, Sullivan revealed that her mother had died two days earlier.

== Discography ==
Studio albums

- Fearless (2008)
- Love Me Back (2010)
- Reality Show (2015)
- Heaux Tales (2021)

== Tours ==
Headlining

- The Reality Show Tour (2015)
- The Heaux Tales Tour (2022)
- Europe 2024 (2024)

Supporting act

- Ne-Yo - Year of the Gentleman Tour (2009)
- Maxwell - The Serenade Tour (2024)

== Filmography ==
=== Television ===
List of television credits
Year	Title	Role	Notes
2019	Godfather of Harlem	Mary Wells	Episode: "By Whatever Means Necessary"

== See also ==
- List of awards and nominations received by Jazmine Sullivan
- List of American Grammy Award winners and nominees
