= Far Away (Kindred the Family Soul song) =

Single by Kindred the Family Soul

from the album Surrender to Love
- B-side: "Rhythm of Life"
- Released: April 14, 2003
- Genre: Neo soul
- Length: 4:16
- Label: Hidden Beach
- Songwriter(s): Aja Graydon; Fatin Dantzler; Elise Perry
- Producer(s): Elise Perry; Steve Harvey

Kindred the Family Soul singles chronology
"Far Away" (2003)	"Where Would I Be (The Question)" (2006)

Music video
- "Far Away" on YouTube

"Far Away" is a song co-written and performed by American neo soul group Kindred the Family Soul, issued as the only official single from their debut album Surrender to Love. The song peaked at #53 on the Billboard R&B chart in 2003.

== Music video ==
The official music video for the song was directed by Jeff Kennedy.

== Chart positions ==
Chart (2003)	Peak position
US Hot R&B/Hip-Hop Singles & Tracks (Billboard)	53
