= Forever Don't Last =

Single by Jazmine Sullivan

from the album Reality Show
- Released: September 16, 2014
- Length: 3:40
- Label: RCA
- Songwriters: Charles T. Harmon; Jazmine Sullivan
- Producer: Chuck Harmony

Jazmine Sullivan singles chronology
"Dumb" (2014)	"Forever Don't Last" (2014)	"Let It Burn" (2015)

"Forever Don't Last" is a song by American singer Jazmine Sullivan. It was written by Sullivan and Chuck Harmony for her third studio album Reality Show (2015), while production was helmed by Harmony. The soulful acoustic jam depicts Sullivan reflecting her emotions on the painful demise of her relationship. Released as the album's second single, the ballad reached the top twenty on the Billboard Adult R&B Songs, peaking at number 17.

== Background ==
"Forever Don't Last" was written by Sullivan and Chuck Harmony for her third studio album Reality Show (2015). The stripped-down, acoustic production details the painful end of a long relationship Sullivan fought to save as she sings: "Trying don’t work, so I just have to face that forever doesn’t last too long these days." The singer called the record "a page from [her] life" as well as her most personal song on Reality Show, telling Billboard: "The most personal song is called 'Forever [Don't Last]." I'm basically crying on that song. It's a ballad, and that's classic Jazmine. It's a letting-go song which is why it's so personal. I feel like I came to a point in my relationship where [I needed] to let go and move on. I just had to do it."

== Music video ==
An accompanying music video was directed by Eshon Burgundy, Sullivan and her mother Pam with the help of friends. Set on the countryside, Sullivan plays a runaway bride who realizes that the love she once had for her man has disappeared. Sullivan's grandmother and grandfather play themselves in the video. The visuals premiered on December 2, 2014 on her YouTube account.

== Credits and personnel ==
Credits adapted from the album's liner notes.

- Kevin "KD" Davis – mixing
- Joe Gallagher – vocal recording
- Jeff Halsey – mixing assistance
- Chuck Harmony – producer, writer
- Mike "Guru" Johnson – production coordinator
- Jazmine Sullivan – vocals, writer

== Charts ==
Chart (2015)	Peak position
US R&B/Hip-Hop Airplay (Billboard)	37
