= Bush Was Right =

2005 song

Single by The Right Brothers

from the album No Apologies
- Released: October 2005
- Genre: Punk rock
- Length: 2:35

"Bush Was Right" is a song by American conservative band The Right Brothers that was first published in October 2005 as a part of their 2006 album No Apologies. Developed as a support song for then President George W. Bush during a time when Bush's popularity was wavering amongst the United States public, the song received international attention upon release. The song interpolates Billy Joel's 1989 song We Didn't Start the Fire, before shifting towards an electric guitar rock beat for the chorus. Professing disdain for various liberal, anti Iraq War, and Democratic politicians, activists, and pundits throughout the song (such as Ted Kennedy and Cindy Sheehan) and praising conservative, interventionist politicians such as Zell Miller, the song became the Right Brothers' most well known hit, gaining them spots on Hugh Hewitt's talk show and starting movements to get the music video played on MTV.
