= The Right Brothers =

American conservative band

- Origin: Nashville, Tennessee, United States
- Genres: Rock; pop punk
- Years active: 2004–2011

The Right Brothers were an American conservative band, consisting of Aaron Sain and Frank Highland of Nashville, Tennessee. They received international attention in 2006 for their song "Bush Was Right", which expressed support for President George W. Bush and the Iraq War. The song received international press coverage, including in the United States, Britain, Poland, Switzerland, Argentina, and Denmark.

== Career ==
In January 2004, RightMarch.com posted their first song, the country-flavored "Hey Hollywood," on their website, and in 72 hours it received 15,000 downloads. Within a few weeks the number was over 35,000. Later, a new song and video surfaced, the anti-abortion and pro-adoption "I Want To Live" and received over 1 million views.

Their song "Bush Was Right" was a topic on cable news, such as MSNBC's Countdown with Keith Olbermann.

Before releasing their last CD, The Right Brothers compiled a special 10-song disc to honor American troops. In 2006, the band opened for Sean Hannity at a rally for Georgia Lieutenant Governor candidate Ralph Reed.

The Right Brothers have appeared on various venues, such as The Michael Medved Show, Maxim Radio, The Hugh Hewitt Show, The Lars Larson Show, C-SPAN, Sound-off Connecticut with Jim Vicevich, The Kirby Wilbur Show in Seattle, Washington, The Liddy & Hill Show in Phoenix, Arizona, The Martha Zoller Show, RightMarch Radio, Take a Stand with Adam McManus, and others. Their music also has been heard on The G. Gordon Liddy Show, as well as National Public Radio.

As of 2011, the Right Brothers were no longer producing music.

== Discography ==
- For My Country (June 2004)
- II (February 2005)
- Remember: A Military Appreciation Project (June 2006)
- No Apologies (December 5, 2006)

=== Singles ===
- Hey Hollywood (January 2004)
- I Want to Live
- Bush Was Right (October 2005)
- Dear Rosie (June 3, 2007)
- One Life (January 4, 2006)

=== Videos ===
- Bush Was Right (2006)
- I Want To Live
- Half of Her Heart (February 19, 2007)
