= Lost One (Jazmine Sullivan song) =

2020 single by Jazmine Sullivan

Single by Jazmine Sullivan

from the album Heaux Tales
- Released: August 28, 2020
- Length: 3:00
- Label: RCA
- Songwriter(s): Jazmine Sullivan; Dave Watson
- Producer(s): Dave Watson

Jazmine Sullivan singles chronology
"Hard to Believe" (2019)	"Lost One" (2020)	"Pick Up Your Feelings" (2020)

Lost One is a song recorded by American singer-songwriter Jazmine Sullivan. It was released by RCA Records on August 28, 2020, as the lead single from her fourth studio album, Heaux Tales. It was written by Sullivan, and co-written and produced by Dave Watson.

== Background ==
Sullivan revealed in December 2019 that she was working on new music and that "an EP is on the way". On August 21, 2020, Sullivan posted a picture via her Instagram account of her performing in her house with three people holding instruments in front of her. Six days later, she announced that a single titled "Lost One" would be released later at midnight EST.

== Cover versions and other usages ==
In September 2020, Avery Wilson released a cover version of "Lost One".

== Charts ==
Chart (2020)	Peak position
US Hot R&B Songs (Billboard)	9

== Release history ==
Country	Date	Format	Label	Ref.
Various	October 28, 2020	Digital download; streaming	RCA	
