= Holding You Down (Goin' in Circles) =

"Holding You Down (Goin' In Circles)"

Single by Jazmine Sullivan

from the album Love Me Back
- Released: July 10, 2010
- Recorded: 2009
- Genre: Funk, psychedelic soul, liquid drum and bass, hip hop soul
- Length: 3:37
- Label: J
- Songwriters: Jazmine Sullivan; Cainon Lamb; Melissa Elliott
- Producers: Missy Elliott; Lamb (co.)

Jazmine Sullivan singles chronology
"World Tour" (2009)	"Holding You Down (Goin' In Circles)" (2010)	"10 Seconds" (2010)

"Holding You Down (Goin' In Circles)" is a song by American singer Jazmine Sullivan. It was written by Sullivan, Cainon Lamb, and Missy Elliott for her second album, Love Me Back (2010), while production was helmed by Elliott, with Lamb credited as co-producer. The song was released as the album's leads single in July 2010. It reached number 60 on the US Billboard Hot 100 and received a Grammy Award nomination for Best Female R&B Vocal Performance at the 53rd Annual Grammy Awards.

== Composition ==
"Holding You Down (Goin' in Circles)" features samples of several songs, including "La Di Da Di" by Slick Rick and Doug E. Fresh, "Be Happy (Remix)" by Mary J. Blige featuring Keith Murray, "Top Billin' " by Audio Two, "Impeach the President by The Honey Drippers", "Affirmative Action" by Nas featuring AZ, Nature, and Foxy Brown, "Let Me Clear My Throat" and "20 Minute Workout" by DJ Kool, and "Make the Music with Your Mouth, Biz" by Biz Markie.

== Music video ==
A music video for the song was shot in early August and directed by Marcus Raboy. In the video, Sullivan is seen throwing a hip-hop house party with some familiar faces, including Doug E. Fresh, Pepa from Salt-N-Pepa, Pete Rock, Kwamé, and producer Missy Elliott. Elliott commented on the theme and background of the video via Twitter, saying "...she did a 90's house jump off so it was fun. Some hip hop legends was in the building that I look up too!" On August 30, 2010, the video premiered on Sullivan's YouTube channel, Vevo, and later premiered on BET's music video countdown show, 106 & Park.

== Remixes ==
A week prior to the song's official digital release, remixes featuring Lloyd Banks and Fat Joe were released. Two weeks following the song's digital release, other remixes featuring Wale and Uncle Murda were released to the public as well. On August 27, 2010, the official remix featuring Mary J. Blige with additional production and vocals by Swizz Beatz appeared. On September 7, a remix featuring Rick Ross was released, they later appeared on a 12" record.

== Credits and personnel ==
Credits adapted from the album's liner notes.

- Missy Elliott – producer, writer
- Paul J. Falcone – additional engineer
- Cainon Lamb – co-producer, drum programming, engineer, writer
- Brandon Parks – engineer
- Jazmine Sullivan – vocals, writer

== Charts ==
Chart (2010)	Peak position
South Korea International (Circle)	85
US Billboard Hot 100	60
US Hot R&B/Hip-Hop Songs (Billboard)	3

== Release history ==
List of release dates, showing region, and release format
Region	Date	Label	Format(s)
United States	July 10, 2010	J Records	Digital download
United Kingdom	August 2, 2010	J Records	CD single; digital download
