= Love Me Back (album) =

Studio album by Jazmine Sullivan
- Released: November 29, 2010
- Studio: Various: Carrington House Studios (Atlanta, Georgia); CNSO Recording Studio (Czech Republic); Cutting Room Studios (New York City, New York); Germano Studios (New York City, New York); Instrument Zoo (Miami, Florida; KMA Studios (New York City, New York); Lostas Studi (Atlanta, Georgia); MSR Studios (New York City, New York); Metropolis Studios (London, England); Strawberrybee Studios (Los Angeles, California; Goldmind Studios (Atlanta, Georgia); The Studio (Philadelphia, Pennsylvania); Waya Flow Studios (Los Angeles, California; Westlake Studios (Los Angeles, California
- Length: 40:12
- Labels: J; Arista
- Producers: Missy Elliott (also exec.); Salaam Remi (also exec.); Anthony Bell; Ricky Blaze; Peter Edge; Toby Gad; Chuck Harmony; Trevor Jerideau; Cainon Lamb; Bei Maejor; Los da Mystro; Ne-Yo; No I.D.; Prolyfic; Salaam Remi; Jazmine Sullivan

Jazmine Sullivan chronology
Fearless (2008)	Love Me Back (2010)	Reality Show (2015)

Singles from Love Me Back
- 1. "Holding You Down (Goin' in Circles)" Released: July 10, 2010; 2. "10 Seconds" Released: October 15, 2010; 3. "Excuse Me" Released: March 25, 2011

Love Me Back is the second studio album by American R&B singer Jazmine Sullivan. It was released by J Records on November 29, 2010. The follow-up to her 2008 debut album Fearless, Sullivan reteamed with producers Salaam Remi, Missy Elliott, her protégé Cainon Lamb and duo Carvin & Ivan to work on the album. New collaborated included Anthony Bel, Chuck Harmony, Los da Mystro, Bei Maejor, No I.D., and Prolyfic as well as singer Ne-Yo. Sullivan co-wrote every song on Love Me Back.

The album was released to received universal acclaim from music critics, who praised its songwriting and Sullivan's singing. It debuted at number 17 on the US Billboard 200, selling 57,000 copies in its first week of release. Love Me Back also reached number five on the US Top R&B/Hip-Hop Albums chart. The album produced three singles, including leading single "Holding You Down (Goin' in Circles)", which peaked at number three on the US Hot R&B/Hip-Hop Songs chart, and follow-ups "10 Seconds" and "Excuse Me".

== Background ==
The album is the follow-up to Sullivan's debut album Fearless (2008), which was well received by music critics, sold 517,000 copies, and earned Sullivan seven Grammy Award nominations. Recording sessions for the album took place at various recording locations, including Carrington House Studios, Goldmind Studios, and Lostas Studi in Atlanta, Georgia, CNSO Recording Studio in Czech Republic, Cutting Room Studios, Germano Studios, KMA Studios, and MSR Studios in New York, New York, Instrument Zoo in Miami, Florida, Metropolis Studios in London, Waya Flow Studios and Westlake Studios in Los Angeles, California, Strawberrybee Studios in California, and The Studio in Philadelphia, Pennsylvania.

== Promotion ==
Love Me Back was released by J Records on November 29, 2010, in the United Kingdom, November 30 in the United States, and December 8 in Japan. Prior to its release, Sullivan accompanied R&B recording artist Mary J. Blige on the latter's Music Saved My Life concert tour during October 2010. Love Me Back was also promoted with three singles: "Holding You Down (Goin' in Circles)" was released on July 10,, "10 Seconds" was released on October 15, and "Excuse Me" on March 25, 2011 The album's cover was premiered on September 21, 2010 and features Sullivan dressed in all black, leaning against a vintage model Chevrolet Impala, a reference to her hit single "Bust Your Windows".

== Critical reception ==
Professional ratings
Aggregate scores
Source	Rating
Metacritic	82/100
Review scores
Source	Rating
AllMusic	5/5 stars
Entertainment Weekly	B+
The Guardian	4/5 stars
Los Angeles Times	3/4 stars
MSN Music (Expert Witness)	A−
The Philadelphia Inquirer	3.5/4 stars
Rolling Stone	3/5 stars
Slant Magazine	3.5/5 stars
Spin	8/10
USA Today	3.5/4 stars

Love Me Back was met with widespread critical acclaim. At Metacritic, which assigns a normalized rating out of 100 to reviews from professional critics, the album received an average score of 82, based on 11 reviews. AllMusic editor Andy Kellman rated the album five out of five stars. He felt that it "sprawls and stuns in equal measure." In Spin magazine, Maura Johnston found Sullivan "both feisty and classy," while Michael Cragg of The Guardian said her singing is marked by experience and accommodates each song. Jon Pareles, writing in The New York Times, felt that Sullivan sounds "narrow and jagged" on the album, "with more grain and more tears as she applies gospel dynamics to her venting." BBC Music critic Natalie Shaw called Love Me Back an "instant and self-assured blast of a record."

New York magazine's Nitsuh Abebe described her voice as "warm, well-textured, and big — authentically, naturally big," and stated, "the warmth and weight of the songwriting and production live up to the singing." Alex Macpherson of The Quietus commended Sullivan for "letting [her] ideas run riot while staying true to genre values" on the "most creative R&B album of the year." In his review for MSN Music, Robert Christgau felt that the songwriting is "a big extra difference maker, with enough pop moves to lighten the overall mood" amid "the soulful melodrama." He believed Sullivan role-plays "with unflinching intelligence" on each song and, although the lyrics could be based on personal history, "it's simpler just to wish every pro was such an astute student of the female condition."

Some reviewers were less receptive. Jon Dolan of Rolling Stone expressed ambivalence about Sullivan's decision to play "a little nicer, adhering to the Mary J. Blige school of gritty, nuanced hip-hop soul." Slant Magazine's Sal Cinquemani felt that the album "fails to reprise many of its predecessor's themes or explore any overarching new ones." Margaret Wappler of the Los Angeles Times said that Sullivan "walks herself to the precipice of emotion without falling off," but lamented what she believed to be not enough "experimentation."

== Commercial performance ==
Love Me Back debuted at number 17 on the Billboard 200 chart, with first-week sales of 57,000 copies in the United States. It also entered at five on Billboard's R&B/Hip-Hop Albums and at number 12 on its Digital Albums chart. The album ultimately spent six weeks on the Billboard 200.

== Track listing ==
Love Me Back track listing
No.	Title	Writer(s)	Producer(s)	Length
1.	"Holding You Down (Goin' in Circles)"	Jazmine Sullivan; Melissa Elliott; Cainon Lamb	Missy Elliott; Lamb^{[a]}	3:36
2.	"10 Seconds"	Sullivan; Salaam Remi	Remi	3:07
3.	"Good Enough"	Sullivan; Charles Harmon	Chuck Harmony	4:02
4.	"Don't Make Me Wait"	Sullivan; Carlos McKinney	Los da Mystro	3:29
5.	"Love You Long Time"	Sullivan; Remi	Remi	3:12
6.	"Redemption"	Sullivan; Anthony Bell; Steve McKie	Bell	3:51
7.	"Excuse Me"	Sullivan; Elliott; Lamb	Elliott; Lamb^{[a]}	3:33
8.	"U Get on My Nerves" (featuring Ne-Yo)	Sullivan; Brandon Green; Shaffer Smith	Bei Maejor; Ne-Yo^{[a]}	3:53
9.	"Stuttering"	Sullivan; Toby Gad	Gad; Remi	3:10
10.	"Famous"	Sullivan; David Ewing; Kevin Randolph; Ernest Wilson	No I.D.; Prolyfic^{[a]}	4:43
11.	"Luv Back"	Sullivan; Elliott; Lamb; Quame Riley	Elliott; Ricky Blaze^{[a]}; Lamb^{[a]}	3:36
Total length:				40:12

iTunes bonus track
No.	Title	Writer(s)	Producer(s)	Length
12.	"In Vain" (pre-order only)	Sullivan; Ewing; Randolph; Wilson	Anthony Bell	4:03

Japan bonus track
No.	Title	Writer(s)	Producer(s)	Length
12.	"Catalogue Girl"	Sullivan; Ivan Barias; Carvin Haggins; Johnnie Smith	Carvin & Ivan	3:23

Notes

- ^{^[a]} denotes vocal producer

== Personnel ==
Credits are adapted from AllMusic.

- Guy Aroch – photography
- Christian Baker – engineer
- Anthony Bell – instrumentation, producer, programming
- Ricky Blaze – drum programming, producer
- Jesse Bonds – guitar
- Anita Marisa Boriboon – art direction, design
- Cary Clark – engineer
- Los DaMystro – conductor, producer
- Gleyder "Gee" Disla – engineer
- DJ Showoff – vocals
- Peter Edge – producer
- Missy "Misdemeanor" Elliott – engineer, executive producer, producer
- Paul J. Falcone – engineer
- Rick Frederick – engineer
- Toby Gad – engineer, piano, producer
- Anthony "Rocky" Gallo – engineer
- Erwin Gorostiza – creative director
- Chuck Harmony – producer
- Brandon Henderson – assistant
- Vincent Henry – flute, alto saxophone, baritone saxophone, tenor saxophone, wah wah guitar
- Trevor Jerideau – producer
- Mike "TrakGuru" Johnson – engineer
- Rob Kinelski – engineer
- StayBent KrunkaDelic – keyboards
- Dave Kutch – mastering
- Lamb – drum programming, engineer, producer
- Erik Madrid – assistant, mixing engineer
- Bei Maejor – producer
- Manny Marroquin – mixing
- Scott Naughton – engineer
- Ne-Yo – producer, vocals
- No I.D. – producer
- Brandon Parks – engineer
- Calvin Parmer – bass
- Christian Plata – assistant
- Prolyfic – additional production
- Questlove – drums, engineer
- Kevin Randolph – keyboards
- Rebel One – management
- Geno Regist – engineer
- Salaam Remi – bass, drum programming, drums, executive producer, Fender rhodes, keyboards, producer, strings
- Harold Robinson – bass
- Andros Rodriguez – engineer
- Davide Rossi – cello, string arrangements, strings, viola, violin
- Ashunta Sheriff – make-up
- Jazmine Sullivan – producer, vocals
- Pam Sullivan – management
- Pamela Watson – stylist
- Sam Wheat – engineer
- Yusef Williams – hair stylist
- Steve Wyreman – guitar

== Charts ==
=== Weekly charts ===
Weekly chart performance for Love Me Back
Chart (2010)	Peak position
US Billboard 200	17
US Top R&B/Hip-Hop Albums (Billboard)	5
US Indie Store Album Sales (Billboard)	20

=== Year-end charts ===
Year-end chart performance for Love Me Back
Chart (2011)	Peak position
US Billboard 200	170
US Top R&B/Hip-Hop Albums (Billboard)	43

== Release history ==
Love Me Back release history
Region	Date	Format(s)	Label	Ref
United Kingdom	November 29, 2010	CD; digital download	RCA	
United States	November 30, 2010	CD; digital download	RCA	
Japan	December 8, 2010	CD; digital download	RCA	
