= Let It Burn (song) =

Single by Jazmine Sullivan

from the album Reality Show
- Released: March 17, 2015
- Length: 3:43
- Label: RCA
- Songwriters: Jazmine Sullivan; Dwane Weir II; Kenneth Edmonds
- Producer: Key Wane

Jazmine Sullivan singles chronology
"Forever Don't Last" (2014)	"Let It Burn" (2015)	"Insecure" (2017)

"Let It Burn" is a song by American singer Jazmine Sullivan. It was written by Sullivan and Key Wane for her third studio album Reality Show (2015), while production was helmed by the latter. The song is built around a sample of "Ready or Not" (1989) by American R&B group After 7. Due to the inclusion of the sample, its writer Kenneth "Babyface" Edmonds is also credited as songwriter.

The song was released as the album's third single and became Reality Show' highest-charting offering, reaching number four on the Billboard Adult R&B Songs chart. At the 58th Annual Grammy Awards, the song — along with its parent album — received two nominations in the categories for Best R&B Song and Best Traditional R&B Performance. After 7 and Sullivan performed a mashup of "Let It Burn" and "Ready or Not" at the 2015 Soul Train Music Awards, celebrating fellow honoree Babyface.

== Background ==
"Let It Burn" was written by Sullivan and producer Key Wane for her third studio album Reality Show (2015) and samples from "Ready or Not" (1989) by American R&B group After 7 as written by Kenneth "Babyace" Edmonds. A throw-back to 1980s music, the song is a dreamy, simmering late-night ballad, that is built upon a synth-heavy instrumentation. Lyrically, "Let It Burn" was inspired by a previous relationship during which Sullivan felt that she was not acting like an ideal girlfriend. In 2019, she revealed that she almost failed to finish the song.

Sullivan recorded her vocals on the song in one take. Pre-produced by frequent collaborator Wane, she initially recognized the melody of "Let It Burn" as something she had heard before, but was not aware of the sample until months after she recorded it. When asked about the sample, she commented: "I don’t mind samples if the feel is there. With “Let it Burn” the track felt so good that I couldn't imagine it without the sample, but I think it helped that I didn't know the original song." Sullivan further described "Let It Burn" as a "classic song, a timeless R&B song."

== Credits and personnel ==
Credits adapted from the album's liner notes.

- Gleyder "Gee" Disla – recording
- Kenneth Edmonds – writer (sample)
- Joe Gallagher – vocal recording
- Gary Noble – mixing
- Jazmine Sullivan – vocals, writer
- Key Wane – producer, writer

== Charts ==
Chart (2015)	Peak position
US Adult R&B Songs (Billboard)	4

== Certifications ==
Region	Certification	Certified units/sales
United States (RIAA)	Gold	500,000^{‡}
^{‡} Sales+streaming figures based on certification alone.
