= Pick Up Your Feelings =

2020 single by Jazmine Sullivan

Single by Jazmine Sullivan

from the album Heaux Tales
- Released: November 20, 2020
- Genre: R&B; neo soul
- Length: 3:52
- Label: RCA
- Songwriters: Jazmine Sullivan; Audra Mae; Brittany Coney; Denisia Andrews; Kyle Coleman; Michael Holmes
- Producers: DZL; Nova Wav

Jazmine Sullivan singles chronology
"Lost One" (2020)	"Pick Up Your Feelings" (2020)	"Girl like Me" (2021)

"Pick Up Your Feelings" is a song by American singer Jazmine Sullivan, released on November 20, 2020, as the second single from her fourth studio album, Heaux Tales (2021). The song was written by Sullivan, Audra Mae, Kyle Coleman, Michael Holmes, Brittany Coney, Denisia Andrews and produced by the latter three. At the 64th Annual Grammy Awards, the song received two nominations for Best R&B Song and Best R&B Performance, winning the latter in a tie with "Leave the Door Open" by Silk Sonic.

On April 13, 2023, Rami of BabyMonster made a cover of the song during the survival show of 'Last Evaluation.' The song entered the Billboard Hot Trending song Powered by Twitter for the first time, peaking at number #8.

== Charts ==
Weekly chart performance for "Pick Up Your Feelings"
Chart (2020–2021)	Peak position
New Zealand Hot Singles (RMNZ)	33
US Billboard Hot 100	75
US Hot R&B/Hip-Hop Songs (Billboard)	27
US R&B/Hip-Hop Airplay (Billboard)	2

=== Year-end charts ===
Year-end chart performance for "Pick Up Your Feelings"
Chart (2021)	Position
US Hot R&B/Hip-Hop Songs (Billboard)	56
US R&B/Hip-Hop Airplay (Billboard)	4

== Certifications ==
Certifications for "Pick Up Your Feelings"
Region	Certification	Certified units/sales
New Zealand (RMNZ)	Gold	15,000^{‡}
United States (RIAA)	Platinum	1,000,000^{‡}
^{‡} Sales+streaming figures based on certification alone.

== Release history ==
Country	Date	Format	Label	Ref.
Various	November 20, 2020	Digital download; streaming	RCA	
United States	January 5, 2021	Urban contemporary	RCA	
United Kingdom	January 29, 2021	Urban contemporary	RCA	
