= Reality Show (album) =

Studio album by Jazmine Sullivan
- Released: January 13, 2015
- Genres: R&B; pop
- Length: 44:13
- Label: RCA
- Producers: Jazmine Sullivan (exec.); Anthony Bell; DJ Dahi; Dilemma; Ben Free; JayFrance; JoeLogic; Chuck Harmony; Da Internz; Salaam Remi; Key Wane; Matt Wong

Jazmine Sullivan chronology
Love Me Back (2010)	Reality Show (2015)	Heaux Tales (2021)

Singles from Reality Show
- 1. "Dumb" Released: May 13, 2014; 2. "Forever Don't Last" Released: September 16, 2014; 3. "Let It Burn" Released: March 17, 2015

Reality Show is the third studio album by American R&B singer Jazmine Sullivan. It was released by RCA Records on January 13, 2015, in the United States. Sullivan recorded the album, her first in five years, during a hiatus from the music industry, writing and working with producers such as Anthony Bell, Salaam Remi, and Key Wane. Reality Show received widespread acclaim from critics and sold 30,000 copies in its first week.

== Background ==
In January 2011, after having released her second album Love Me Back (2010), Sullivan announced via Twitter that she was indefinitely leaving the music industry saying, "I promised myself when it wasn't fun anymore I wouldn't do it. And, here I am. I'm not saying I won't ever sing again in my life because I don't believe that. But in this moment… right now… [I] got some things to figure out". In 2014, she announced her new album, Reality Show. In a 2014 interview with Billboard, Sullivan described her return as inevitable saying she "...can't escape [her] calling."

== Release and reception ==
Professional ratings
Aggregate scores
Source	Rating
AnyDecentMusic?	7.9/10
Metacritic	85/100
Review scores
Source	Rating
AllMusic	4.5/5 stars
Complex	3.5/5 stars
Exclaim!	8/10
HipHopDX	4.0/5
Now	4/5
Pitchfork	8.1/10
Slant Magazine	4/5 stars
Spin	8/10
Vice (Expert Witness)	A−

Reality Show was released by RCA Records on January 13, 2015. In its first week, it debuted at number 12 on the Billboard 200 and sold 30,000 copies in the United States.

Reality Show received widespread acclaim from critics. At Metacritic, which assigns a normalized rating out of 100 to reviews from mainstream publications, it received an average score of 85, based on 9 reviews. In The New York Times, Jon Pareles said the record shrewdly mixes older elements of soul music with modern drum programming, while the themes of romantic dysfunction intensify and inspire Sullivan's singing. "Playing a woman too often scorned", Pareles wrote, "she comes out victoriously soulful." AllMusic's Andy Kellman felt she sings more confidently than before and concluded in his review, "Just as potent and lasting as Fearless and Love Me Back, Reality Show completes one of the most impressive first-three-album runs." Ryan B. Patrick of Exclaim! stated that Sullivan's return was a welcome one, as she delivers "an R&B album that feels like how R&B used to sound circa late 1990s/early 2000 while still coming off as forward-looking". Pitchfork critic David Drake hailed Sullivan's voice as the best in contemporary R&B and said "her songs work so well because they allow the listener to experience them at face value or more holistically, shifting perspectives as rapidly as in life itself.".

== Accolades ==
Reality Show was ranked number 44 on Pitchfork's list of 2015's best albums, while Rap-Up named it the year's tenth best record. It was also nominated for the 2015 Grammy Award for Best R&B Album, while the song "Let It Burn" received nominations in the categories of Best R&B Song and Best Traditional R&B Performance.

Publication	Accolade	Year	Rank
Pitchfork	The 50 Best Albums of 2015	2015	44
Rap-Up	The 10 Best Albums of 2015	2015	10
Rated R&B	The 50 Best R&B Albums of The Decade	2019	36

== Track listing ==
No.	Title	Writer(s)	Producer(s)	Length
1.	"Dumb" (featuring Meek Mill)	Jazmine Sullivan; Salaam Remi; Dwane Weir II; Robert Williams	Remi; Key Wane	3:31
2.	"Mascara"	Sullivan; Weir II	Key Wane	4:13
3.	"Brand New"	Sullivan; Dacoury Natche; Benjamin Freedlander	DJ Dahi; Ben Free	3:27
4.	"Silver Lining"	Sullivan; Weir II	Key Wane	3:17
5.	"#HoodLove"	Sullivan; Charles Harmon	Chuck Harmony	3:45
6.	"Let It Burn"	Sullivan; Weir II; Kenny "Babyface" Edmonds	Key Wane	3:43
7.	"Veins"	Sullivan; Weir II	Key Wane	3:50
8.	"Forever Don't Last"	Sullivan; Birdsong; Harmon	Harmony	3:39
9.	"Stupid Girl"	Sullivan; Matt Wong; Joe "JoeLogic" Gallagher; Dan "Dilemma" Thomas	JoeLogic; Dilemma; Wong	2:54
10.	"Stanley"	Sullivan; Marcos Palacios; Ernest Clark; Tony Russell; Kevin Randolph	Da Internz	4:29
11.	"Masterpiece (Mona Lisa)"	Sullivan; Anthony Bell	Bell; JayFrance	4:05

iTunes bonus track
No.	Title	Writer(s)	Producer(s)	Length
12.	"If You Dare"	Sullivan; Wong; Gallagher; Thomas	JoeLogic; Dilemma; Wong	3:22

Sample credits:

“Let It Burn” samples “Ready or Not” by After 7.

== Personnel ==
Credits are adapted from AllMusic.

- Anthony Bell – instrumentation, musician, producer, programming
- Tyler Bellinger – choir, chorus
- Amber Bullock – vocals (background)
- Maddox Chimm – assistant
- Da Internz – producer
- Kevin "KD" Davis – mixing
- Dilemma – producer
- Gleyder "Gee" Disla – engineer
- DJ Dahi – keyboards, producer, programming
- Peter Edge – producer
- Twanetta M. Ferebee-Brown – choir, chorus
- Benjamin Freedlander – keyboards, producer
- Joe Gallagher – engineer, vocal engineer
- Erwin Gorostiza – creative director
- Jeff Halsey – assistant
- Kevin Hanson – guitar
- Stacey Harcum – choir, chorus
- Chuck Harmony – producer
- Michelle Holme – art direction, design
- Jaycen Joshua – mixing
- Trevor Jerideau – A&R, producer
- JoeLogic – producer
- Mike "Guru" Johnson – production coordination
- Ryan Kaul – assistant
- Dave Kutch – mastering
- Erik Madrid – mixing
- Shane McCauley – photography
- Meek Mill – featured artist
- Sophia Nicole Stephens – choir, chorus
- Gary Noble – mixing
- Tyron Perrin – vocals (background)
- Karl Peterson – engineer
- Kevin Randolph – keyboards
- Salaam Remi – A&R, arranger, drums, keyboards, producer
- Nicole Renee – choir, chorus
- Tony Russell – bass,
- Richard "Tubbs" Smith – keyboards
- Christopher Stevens – trumpet
- Jazmine Sullivan – executive producer, primary artist, producer, vocals (background)
- Pamela Sullivan – vocals (background)
- Laurin Talese – choir, chorus
- Dan Thomas – drum programming
- Vincent Vu – assistant
- Key Wane – arranger, bass, drums, keyboards, producer
- Matt Wong – bass, keyboards, strings
- Kenta Yonesaka – engineer

== Charts ==
=== Weekly charts ===
Chart (2015)	Peak position
UK R&B Albums (Official Charts)	20
US Billboard 200	12
US Top R&B/Hip-Hop Albums (Billboard)	2

=== Year-end charts ===
Chart (2015)	Position
US Top R&B/Hip-Hop Albums (Billboard)	41
