= Surrender to Love =

Studio album by Kindred the Family Soul
- Released: February 25, 2003
- Genre: Neo soul
- Length: 73:29
- Label: Hidden Beach
- Producer: Steve McKeever (exec.)

Kindred the Family Soul chronology
Surrender to Love (2003)	'In This Life Together' (2005)

Singles from Surrender to Love
- 1. "Far Away" Released: 2003

Professional ratings
Review scores
Source	Rating
AllMusic	4.5/5 stars

Surrender to Love is the debut studio album by American neo soul group Kindred the Family Soul, released February 25, 2003 via Hidden Beach Recordings. It peaked at #159 on the Billboard 200 and #29 on the Billboard R&B chart. The album's only official single was "Far Away", which peaked at #53 on the Billboard R&B singles chart.

== Track listing ==
No.
Title
Writer(s)
Producer(s)
Length
1.
"Ryva"
- Aquil Dantzler
- Ryva Parker

0:40
2.
"Surrender to Love"
- Aja Graydon
- Fatin Dantzler
- Anthony Bell
- Aja Graydon
- Fatin Dantzler
- Anthony Bell
4:31
3.
"Rhythm of Life"
- Aja Graydon
- Fatin Dantzler
- Elise Perry
- Elise Perry
- David Ivory
6:12
4.
"Far Away"
- Aja Graydon
- Fatin Dantzler
- Elise Perry
- Elise Perry
- Steve Harvey
4:16
5.
"Weather the Storm"
- Aja Graydon
- Fatin Dantzler
- Gus Rickette
- Ivan Dupée
- Shawn Hibbler
Ivan Dupée
4:51
6.
"We" (featuring Ursula Rucker)
- Aja Graydon
- Fatin Dantzler
- Ursula Rucker
- Chuck Treece
- Clifton Davis
- Omar Edwards
- Aja Graydon
- Fatin Dantzler
- Chuck Treece
3:45
7.
"Stars"
- Aja Graydon
- Fatin Dantzler
- Sharief Hobley
- Andre Harris
- Vidal Davis
- Andre Harris
- Vidal Davis
5:08
8.
"I Am" (featuring Jazmine Sullivan)
- Aja Graydon
- Shawn Hibbler
Ivan Dupée
4:51
9.
"Family Song" (Reprise)
- Henry Krieger
- Tom Eyen
- Aja Graydon
- Fatin Dantzler
1:22
10.
"What Happens Now"
- Aja Graydon
- Fatin Dantzler
- Ivan Dupée
- Richard Patterson
Ivan Dupée
4:18
11.
"Meant to Be"
- Aja Graydon
- Fatin Dantzler
- Ivan Dupée
- Richard Patterson
Ivan Dupée
4:24
12.
"Contentment"
- Aja Graydon
- Anthony Bell
- Aja Graydon
- Fatin Dantzler
- Anthony Bell
3:59
13.
"Spread the Word" ( (Note: "Spread the Word" contains a sample of "River Niger" as performed by War.))
- Aja Graydon
- Fatin Dantzler
- Morris Dickerson
- Charles Miller
- Harold Brown
- Howard E. Scott
- Jerry Goldstein
- Lee Oskar
- Leroy Jordan
- Sylvester Allen
- Aja Graydon
- Fatin Dantzler
5:45
14.
"If I" ( (Note: "If I" contains a sample of "Holiday" as performed by Mandrill.))
- Aja Graydon
- Fatin Dantzler
- Carlos Wilson
- Claude Cave II
- Lou Wilson
- Ric Wilson
- James Poyser
James Poyser
4:55
15.
"Entertain the Peoplez" (Interlude)
- Aquil Dantzler
- Fatin Dantzler

0:07
16.
"Don't Wanna Suffer" (Carbon Copy (Note: "Don't Wanna Suffer" contains an interpolation of "1993" as performed by The Soul Searchers.))
- Aja Graydon
- Fatin Dantzler
- James Poyser
- John Buchanan
James Poyser
3:00
17.
"Party's Over" (featuring Flo Brown and Malik B.)
- Aja Graydon
- Fatin Dantzler
- Falona Brown
- Malik Abdul Basit
- James Poyser
- Aja Graydon
- Fatin Dantzler
- James Poyser
4:04
18.
"Freedom"
- Aja Graydon
- Fatin Dantzler
- Aja Graydon
- Fatin Dantzler
2:50
19.
"Clap Your Hands"
- Aja Graydon
- Fatin Dantzler
- Charles Njapa
Charles Njapa
0:04

Silent tracks
20.	Untitled	0:05
21.	Untitled	0:05
22.	Untitled	0:05
23.	Untitled	0:05
24.	Untitled	0:05

25.
"Rhythm of Life" (King Britt Remix)
- Aja Graydon
- Fatin Dantzler
- Elise Perry
King Britt
4:07
Total length:
73:29

== Chart positions ==
Chart (2000)	Peak position
US Billboard 200	159
US Heatseekers (Billboard)	7
US R&B Albums (Billboard)	29
