= Heaux Tales =

Studio album by Jazmine Sullivan
- Released: January 8, 2021
- Genres: R&B; hip-hop
- Length: 32:21
- Label: RCA
- Producers: Key Wane; DZL; Cardiak; Kevin "Wu10" Wooten; Jairus "JMO" Mozee; Dev Hynes; Dave "Pop" Watson; Dilemma; Joe Logic; Gee; Uforo "Bongo ByTheWay" Ebong

Jazmine Sullivan chronology
Reality Show (2015)	Heaux Tales (2021)

Singles from Heaux Tales
- 1. "Lost One" Released: August 28, 2020; 2. "Pick Up Your Feelings" Released: November 20, 2020; 3. "Girl like Me" Released: January 6, 2021; 4. "Hurt Me So Good" Released: May 31, 2022

Heaux Tales is the fourth studio album by American R&B singer Jazmine Sullivan. Released by RCA Records on January 8, 2021, it was her first project since 2015's critically-acclaimed Reality Show. It includes features from Ari Lennox, Anderson .Paak, and H.E.R. The album was primarily recorded in Sullivan's Philadelphia home.

The project has also been variably identified as a "concept album" and "schematic, a successor to didactic concept albums like The Miseducation of Lauryn Hill". Structurally, six "spoken word interludes" "are followed by songs that flesh them out as character studies". The themes explored include feminism, sexuality, classism, and body-shaming among other lyrical topics supported by narrative interludes between each song. The project received widespread critical acclaim and was also a commercial success, debuting at number four on the US Billboard 200 chart, marking Sullivan's highest position on the chart.

Heaux Tales won Album of the Year at the 2021 BET Awards and the 2021 Soul Train Music Awards; it was named Album of the Year by NPR, Entertainment Weekly, LA Times and Pitchfork. The album won Best R&B Album at the 64th Grammy Awards, and its single "Pick Up Your Feelings" was nominated for Best R&B Song and won for Best R&B Performance. The project was further promoted by the Heaux Tales Tour in 2022, Sullivan's third US headlining tour. Sullivan released the deluxe edition of the project, titled Heaux Tales, Mo' Tales: The Deluxe, on February 11, 2022.

== Background ==
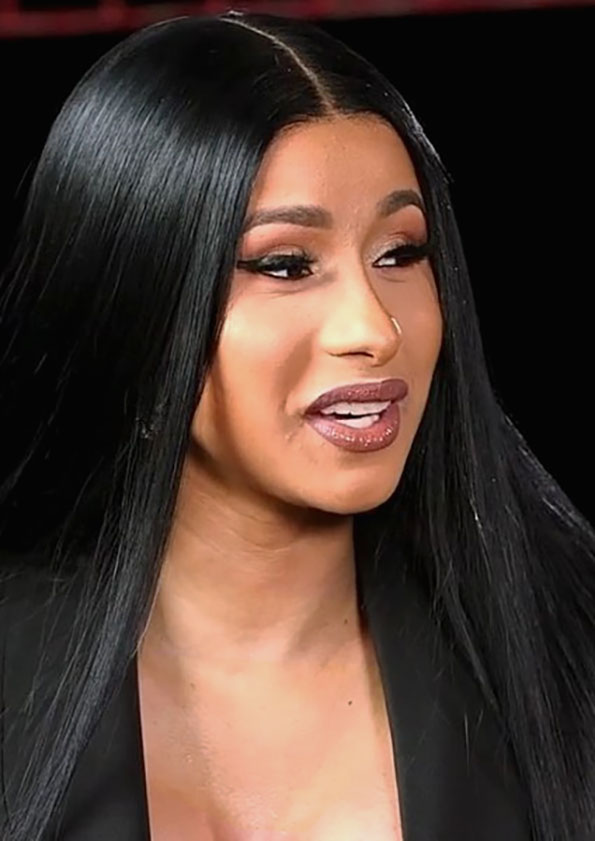
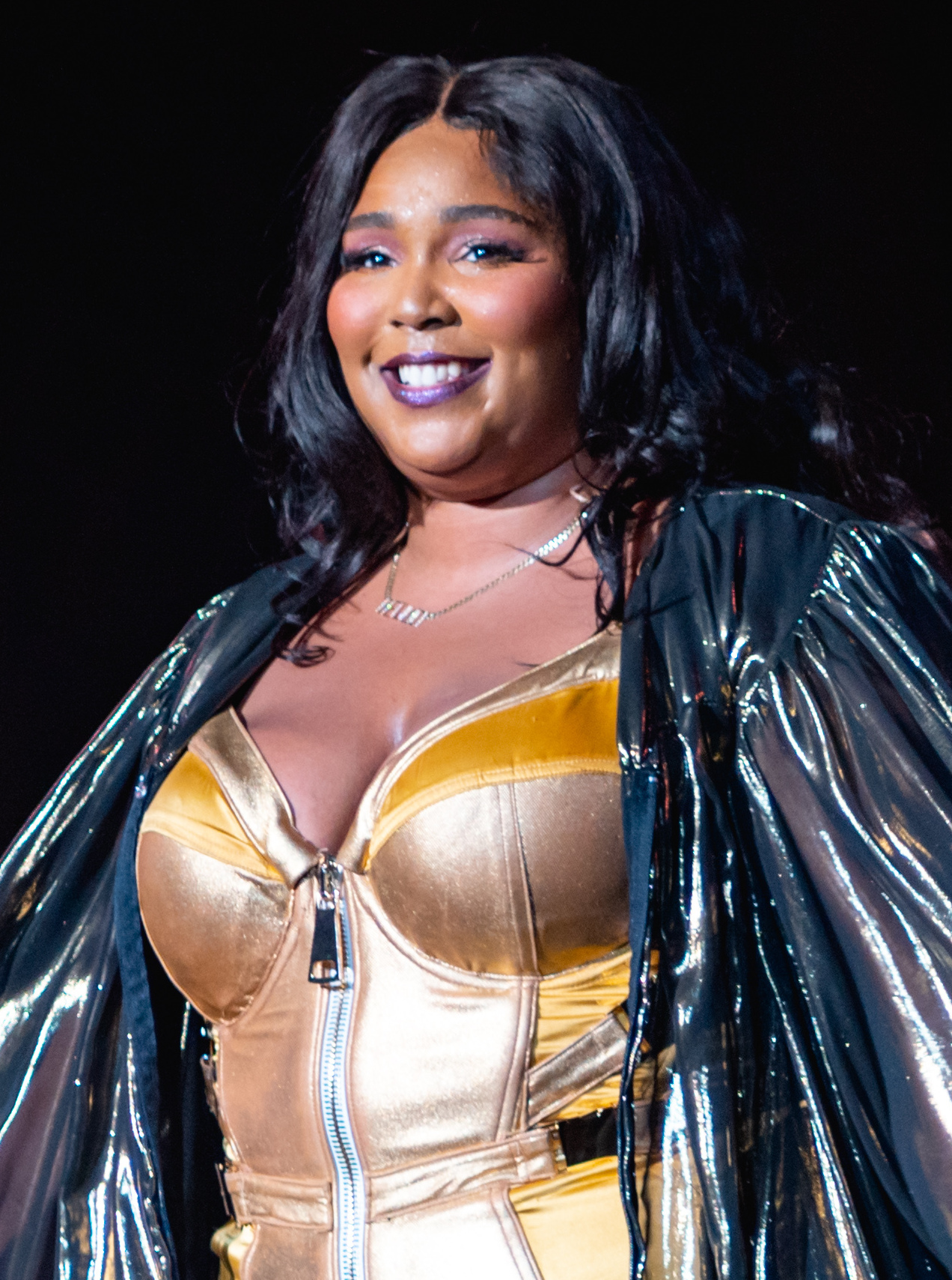
Sullivan cited artists Cardi B and Lizzo as women that inspired Heaux Tales.

Since establishing her recording career in 2008, Sullivan has been known to take long hiatuses between releases.

"Heaux Tales is about my observation of today's women standing in their power and owning who they are — No longer is male patriarchy dictating what it means to be a 'good girl.' The truth is, women of all ages have been called a 'heaux' at some point in life, whether deserved or not, by some man trying to put us in our place; a place designed to keep us under control, out of the way and usually beneath them. [...] We all have a journey to make and it's our choice alone how we get there."

— Jazmine Sullivan on the premise of Heaux Tales

Complex magazine reports that Dev Hynes, Key Wane, DZL, and others contributed to the production on the project. The promotional rollout for Heaux Tales included the premiere of her installment of NPR's Tiny Desk Concerts series on January 8, 2021. Sullivan stated in an interview with NPR Music, "particularly on this project, I was influenced by a few women today that I felt like were busting through those barriers and helping me to feel more confident in who I am," citing artists Cardi B and Lizzo.

== Singles ==
The first single, an acoustic ballad titled "Lost One", was released August 28, 2020 and peaked at number 9 on Billboard's US Hot R&B Songs. The second single was "Pick Up Your Feelings", released November 20, 2020. In place of a traditional music video, RCA Records released a live acoustic performance. The song has since reached number 1 on Billboard's Adult R&B Airplay Chart and number 9 on the R&B/Hip-Hop airplay chart. The song also peaked at number 75 on the Billboard Hot 100. Both singles were performed on BET during the Soul Train Music Awards on November 29, 2020. Sullivan released her third single, "Girl like Me", featuring H.E.R., on January 6, 2021, marking the first time she has ever duetted with a woman on one of her own recordings. The song debuted and peaked at number 96 on the Billboard Hot 100 and at number 29 on Billboard's Hot R&B/Hip-Hop Songs chart. "On It," duet with Ari Lennox, also peaked at number 40 on Billboard's Hot R&B/Hip-Hop and R&B/Hip-Hop airplay charts despite not being released as a single.

== Critical reception ==
Professional ratings
Aggregate scores
Source	Rating
AnyDecentMusic?	7.6/10
Metacritic	81/100
Review scores
Source	Rating
Beats Per Minute	80%
Clash	8/10
Exclaim!	8/10
Pitchfork	8.6/10; 8.4/10 (deluxe)
Rolling Stone	4/5 stars
Tom Hull – on the Web	B+

Heaux Tales received a score of 81 out of 100 from review aggregate site Metacritic based on nine reviews, indicating "universal acclaim". Vulture lauded its displays of women's strength as seen in its "interludes [with] women like fellow singer Ari Lennox talking about femininity and sexual empowerment." Alex Suskind of Entertainment Weekly called the project "a punchy concept album that tackles blissful romance, sexual freedom — and the complex moments that arise between." Bobby Carter of NPR hailed it "a bold and timely conversation piece addressing truths regarding relationships, sex, social norms, self-worth and a myriad of other topics that women grapple with." Wongo Okon of Uproxx praised it for casting "a light on the goalpost-shifting standards of this patriarchal society" while holding "the characteristics to be labeled a classic in the future." Mankaprr Conteh of Pitchfork gave the EP the site's Best New Music distinction.

=== Accolades ===
List of awards and nominations received by Heaux Tales
Year	Award	Category	Result
2021	American Music Awards	Favorite Soul/R&B Album	Nominated
2021	BET Awards	Album of the Year	Won
2021	Soul Train Music Awards	Album of the Year	Won
2022	Grammy Awards	Best R&B Album	Won
2022	NAACP Image Awards	Outstanding Album	Won

Heaux Tales on year-end lists
Publication	List	Rank	Ref.
Billboard	Best Albums of 2021: Top 50 Staff Picks	9	
Entertainment Weekly	The 10 Best Albums of 2021	1	
The Guardian	The 50 Best Albums of 2021	12	
Los Angeles Times	The 10 Best Albums of 2021	1	
NPR	Best Albums of 2021	1	
Paste	The 50 Best Albums of 2021	24	
Pitchfork	The 50 Best Albums of 2021	1	
Rolling Stone	The 50 Best Albums of 2021	7	
Rolling Stone	The 50 Greatest Concept Albums of All Time	29	
The Ringer	The Best Albums of 2021	2	
TIME	The 10 Best Albums of 2021	10	
Vulture	The Best Albums of 2021	1	

== Commercial performance ==
Heaux Tales debuted at number four on the US Billboard 200 chart, earning 43,000 album-equivalent units (including 7,000 copies as pure album sales) in its first week, according to MRC Data. This became Sullivan's second US top-ten album (following 2008's Fearless) and her highest-charting album in the US. The album also debuted at number one on the US Top R&B Albums and number two on the US Top R&B/Hip-Hop Albums charts. It also accumulated a total of 46 million on-demand streams of the project's songs that week. On September 6, 2022, the EP was certified Gold by the RIAA.

== Track listing ==
Heaux Tales standard edition track listing
No.	Title	Writer(s)	Producer(s)	Length
1.	"Bodies (Intro)"	Dwane Weir II; Jazmine Sullivan	Key Wane	2:01
2.	"Antoinette's Tale"	Antoinette Henry	Sullivan	0:37
3.	"Pick Up Your Feelings"	Audra Mae Butts; Denisia "Blu June" Andrews; Brittany "Chi" Coney; Kyle Coleman; Sullivan; Michael Holmes	DZL	3:49
4.	"Ari's Tale" (performed by Ari Lennox)	Courtney Salter	Sullivan	0:49
5.	"Put It Down"	Jason Vaughan; Weir II; Sullivan	Key Wane	3:21
6.	"On It" (featuring Ari Lennox)	Kevin Wooten; Carl McCormick; Sullivan; Salter	Cardiak; WU10	3:25
7.	"Donna's Tale"	Donna Anderson; Cheryl White; Anitra Sasser	Sullivan	1:10
8.	"Price Tags" (featuring Anderson .Paak)	Jairus Mozee; Brandon P. Anderson; Sullivan	J.Mo	4:23
9.	"Rashida's Tale"	Rashida Northington	Sullivan	1:00
10.	"Lost One"	Sullivan; Dave Watson, Jr.	Dave "Pop" Watson	2:58
11.	"Precious' Tale"	Precious Daughtry	Sullivan	0:43
12.	"The Other Side"	Dan Thomas; Matt Wong; Joe Gallagher; Sam Wishkoski; Sullivan	JoeLogic; Gee; Dilemma	3:37
13.	"Amanda's Tale"	Amanda Henderson	Sullivan	0:37
14.	"Girl Like Me" (featuring H.E.R.)	Sullivan; Gabriella Wilson; Tarron Crayton; Uforo Ebong	Bongo ByTheWay	3:44
Total length:				32:21

Heaux Tales, Mo' Tales deluxe edition track listing
No.	Title	Writer(s)	Producer(s)	Length
15.	"Issa's Tale"	Issa Rae	Manman	1:11
16.	"Tragic"	Sullivan; Leven Kali	Kali	3:26
17.	"Jazzy's Tale"	Sullivan	Manman	0:49
18.	"Hurt Me So Good"	Akeel Henry; Sullivan; Elliott Trent; Luca Mauti; Holmes	Akeel Henry; DZL; Mauti	3:32
19.	"A Breaux's Tale"			0:42
20.	"Roster"	Sullivan; Wishkoski	Sam Wish	3:40
21.	"Mona's Tale"		Manman	0:26
22.	"BPW"	Sullivan; Wishkoski	Sam Wish	3:22
23.	"Shanti's Tale"		Manman	0:41
24.	"Selfish"	Coney; Andrews; Sullivan	Nova Wav	3:51
Total length:				54:01

== Personnel ==
Musicians

- Jon L. Smith – bass (1,11)
- Antoinette Henry – vocals (1)
- Ari Lennox – vocals (4 and 6)
- Donna Anderson – vocals (7)
- Anitra Sasser – vocals (7)
- Cheryl White – vocals (7)
- Rashida Northington – vocals (9)
- Jermaine Blandford – bass (11)
- Precious Daughtry – vocals (11)
- Sam Wishkoski – strings (12)
- Amanda Henderson – vocals (13)
- Isaac Wriston – bass (6)

Technical

- Jazmine Sullivan – executive producer
- Dave Kutch – mastering engineer
- Erik Madrid – mixing engineer (1–3, 5, 6)
- Manny Marroquin – mixing engineer (8, 10, 14)
- Chris Galland – mixing engineer (8, 10, 14)
- Joe Gallagher – mixing engineer (12), engineer (1–3, 5, 8–10, 12, 14)
- Justin Miller – engineer (1–3, 5, 8–10, 12, 14)
- Ben Thomas – engineer (2, 3, 9, 10)
- Owen Modamwen – engineer (6)
- Dave Watson – engineer (6)
- Jhair "JHA" Lazo – engineer (8)
- Miki Tsutsumi – engineer (14)
- Dave "Pop" Watson– recording engineer (9)
- Aaron Mattes – assistant engineer (1–3, 5)
- Jeremie Inhaber – assistant engineer (8, 10, 14)
- Scott Desmarais – assistant engineer (8, 10, 14)
- Alex Pyle – assistant engineer (14)

== Charts ==
=== Weekly charts ===
Weekly chart performance for Heaux Tales
Chart (2021–2022)	Peak position
UK Albums (Official Charts)	79
UK R&B Albums (Official Charts)	9
US Billboard 200	4
US Top R&B/Hip-Hop Albums (Billboard)	2
US Indie Store Album Sales (Billboard)	8

=== Year-end charts ===
Year-end chart performance for Heaux Tales
Chart (2021)	Position
US Billboard 200	195
US Top R&B/Hip-Hop Albums (Billboard)	77

== Certifications ==
Certifications and sales for Heaux Tales
Region	Certification	Certified units/sales
United States (RIAA)	Gold	500,000^{‡}
^{‡} Sales+streaming figures based on certification alone.
