= Kindred the Family Soul =

American neo soul duo

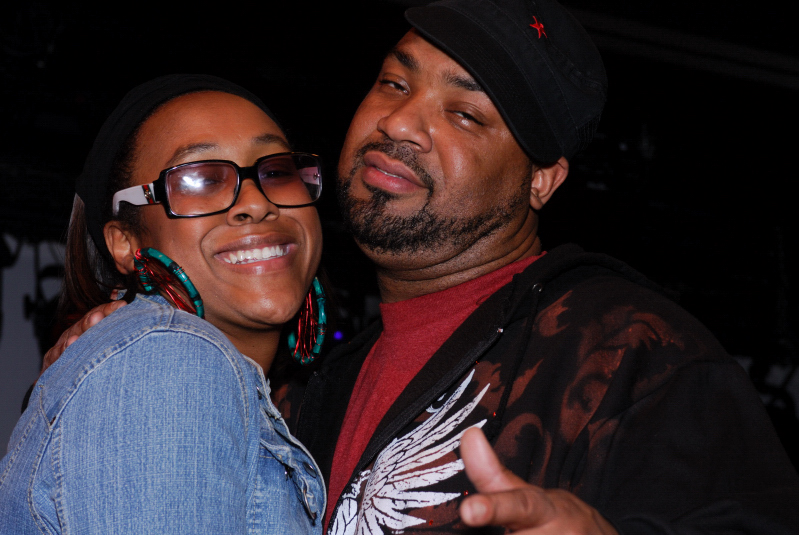
- Kindred the Family Soul at the 2007 Black Lily Film & Music Festival at World Cafe Live in Philadelphia, Pennsylvania in May 2007

Background information
- Also known as: Kindred
- Origin: Philadelphia, Pennsylvania, United States
- Genres: R&B, soul, neo soul, jazz
- Years active: 1999–present
- Labels: Hidden Beach, Shanachie
- Members: Fatin Dantzler; Aja Graydon
- Website: www.kindredthefamilysoul.com

Kindred the Family Soul, also referred to as simply Kindred, is an American neo soul duo consisting of married couple Fatin Dantzler (born in 1973 in Camden, New Jersey) and Aja Graydon (born September 25, 1978, in Los Angeles, California). Signed to Hidden Beach Recordings, Kindred emerged from the Philadelphia neo soul movement that also includes Jill Scott, who introduced them to her then label president Steve McKeever of Hidden Beach Recordings while the couple was performing at the Black Lily Showcase in Philly weekly back in 2000. Kindred would go on to sign their first recording contract with the label.

After two years of work on the CD, Hidden Beach issued their debut album Surrender to Love in February 2003, which included the single "Far Away". Their follow-up album was 2005's In This Life Together—its title being a reference to Ossie Davis and Ruby Dee's 1998 book With Ossie & Ruby: In This Life Together—, spawning the single "Where Would I Be (The Question)".

The duo were nominated for a Soul Train Music Award for Best R&B/Soul Album, Group Band or Duo for Surrender to Love in 2004 and a BET Award for the BET J Cool Like That Award in 2006. The group's third LP, The Arrival, was released on October 21, 2008. In 2011 the group released the LP Love Has No Recession, which featured many guest artists including the late Chuck Brown, Snoop Dogg, Raheem Devaughn, BJ the Chicago Kid, and Bilal. That record spawned the top 40 Urban AC single "Magic Happens". In 2014, the group released A Couple Friends. In 2016, they released Legacy Of Love which includes the hit single “All My People”. Kindred is currently preparing to release new Music in the year 2020 also hugely focused on their interview and performing series Kindred Presents. In 2021, they released "Auntie & Unc" which features their single "Break It Down".

== Discography ==
=== Albums ===
List of studio albums, with selected chart positions, sales figures and certifications
| Title | Album details | Peak chart positions | |
| Title | Album details | US | US R&B |
|---|---|---|---|
| Surrender to Love | Released: February 25, 2003; Label: Hidden Beach Recordings | 159 | 29 |
| In This Life Together | Released: September 20, 2005; Label: Hidden Beach Recordings | 77 | 15 |
| The Arrival | Released: October 21, 2008; Label: Hidden Beach Recordings | 67 | 7 |
| Love Has No Recession | Released: July 26, 2011; Label: Shanachie Records | 90 | 19 |
| A Couple Friends | Released: June 10, 2014; Label: Shanachie Records | — | 23 |
| Legacy Of Love | Released: August 30, 2016; Label: Self-released | — | 32 |
| Auntie and Unc | Released: March 27, 2021; Label: Self-released | — | — |
| Grand Life | Released: October 3, 2025; Label: Self-released | – | – |

=== Singles ===
| Year | Single | Chart positions | | | | | Album |
| Year | Single | U.S. R&B | U.S. R&B Airplay | U.S. Adult R&B | U.S. R&B Recurrents | U.S. R&B Recurrent Airplay | Album |
|---|---|---|---|---|---|---|---|
| 2003 | "Far Away" | 53 | 5 | - | 6 | 6 | Surrender to Love |
| 2004 | "Stars" | - | - | - | 10 | 9 | Surrender to Love |
| 2006 | "Where Would I Be (The Question)" | 41 | 4 | 10 | 2 | 1 | In This Life Together |
| 2006 | "Woman First" | - | - | 22 | - | - | In This Life Together |
| 2006 | "Thru Love" | - | - | 33 | - | - | In This Life Together |
| 2008 | "House of Love" | 86 | - | 26 | - | - | The Arrival |
| 2008 | "Just the Way You Are" | - | - | - | - | - | The Arrival |
| 2011 | "Magic Happens" | 92 | - | 31 | - | - | Love Has No Recession |
| 2011 | "You Got Love" (featuring Snoop Dogg) | - | - | - | - | - | Love Has No Recession |
| 2011 | "Sticking with You" | - | - | - | - | - | Love Has No Recession |
| 2011 | "Take A Look Around" (featuring BJ The Chicago Kid & Bilal) | - | - | - | - | - | Love Has No Recession |
| 2012 | "Going To The Go-Go" (featuring Chuck Brown & DJ Kool) | - | - | - | - | - | Love Has No Recession |
| 2012 | "Authentically You" (featuring Lady Alma) | - | - | - | - | - | Love Has No Recession |
| 2014 | "Everybody's Hustling" | - | - | - | - | - | A Couple Friends |
| 2014 | "A Couple Friends" (featuring Valerie Simpson) | - | - | - | - | - | A Couple Friends |
| 2014 | "Call Me Crazy" | - | - | - | - | - | A Couple Friends |
| 2014 | "Get It, Got It" | - | - | - | - | - | A Couple Friends |
| 2016 | "All My People" | - | - | - | - | - | Legacy of Love |
| 2021 | "Break It Down" | - | - | - | - | - | Auntie & Unc |
