= 10 Seconds (song) =

Single by Jazmine Sullivan

from the album Love Me Back (Jazmine Sullivan album)
- Released: October 15, 2010
- Recorded: 2009
- Genre: Orchestral pop, R&B, new jack swing, neo soul, drum and bass
- Length: 3:07
- Label: J
- Songwriters: Jazmine Sullivan; Salaam Remi
- Producer: Salaam Remi

Jazmine Sullivan singles chronology
| "Holding You Down (Goin' In Circles)" (2010) | "10 Seconds" (2010) | "Excuse Me" (2011) |

"10 Seconds" is a song by American singer Jazmine Sullivan. It was written by Sullivan and Salaam Remi for her second studio album, Love Me Back (2010), with production helmed by the latter. It was released on October 15, 2010, as the album's second single and reached number 15 on the US Hot R&B/Hip-Hop Songs.

== Background ==
"10 Seconds" was written by Sullivan and frequent collaborator Salaam Remi for her second studio album, Love Me Back (2010). Lyrically, it features the singer telling her man that he has done her wrong too many times and he got only ten seconds to leave, belting, "You broke my heart, with all your lies, you really should look for an exit, 'Cause you running out of time." A soulful throwback track, consisting of layers of instrumentation, it features an urgent piano line and bluesy guitar tussle with saxophones, strings and a flute.

== Music video ==
The music video for "10 Seconds" was shot in early October 2010 by Benny Boom. It premiered on November 12, 2010, and features an angry Jazmine kidnap her cheating boyfriend and torture him in an old abandoned building. The video begins with Jazmine's boyfriend getting to his car, only to be kidnapped by Sullivan. He is then seen in an abandoned building strapped to a chair with a bomb. When the music starts, Jazmine appears and shows a picture of the man and another girl. On the second verse, Jazmine presses a button that shows videos of him and the girl together. It then shows one of her throwing something at him. At this point she pours a glass of wine on him. When the bridge comes, the man has flashbacks of the things that happened. At the end of the video, when he only has ten seconds before the bomb explodes, Jazmine leaves the room. The man then realizes he was only dreaming.

== Track listing ==
Digital download

1. "10 Seconds" – 3:07

== Credits and personnel ==
Credits adapted from the album's liner notes.

- Gleyder "Gee" Disla – recording
- Vincent Henry – instruments
- Salaam Remi – instruments, producer
- Andros Rodriguez – additional recording
- Jazmine Sullivan – vocals, writer

== Charts ==
=== Weekly charts ===
| Chart (2010–11) | Peak position |
|---|---|
| Canada Urban Airplay (Nielsen BDS) | 17 |
| US Bubbling Under Hot 100 (Billboard) | 6 |
| US Hot R&B/Hip-Hop Songs (Billboard) | 15 |

=== Year-end charts ===
| Chart (2011) | Position |
|---|---|
| US Adult R&B Songs (Billboard) | 45 |
| US Hot R&B/Hip-Hop Songs (Billboard) | 67 |

== Release history ==
List of release dates, showing region, and release format
| Region | Date | Format(s) | Label |
|---|---|---|---|
| United States | October 15, 2010 | Digital download | J Records |
