= Raheem DeVaughn discography =

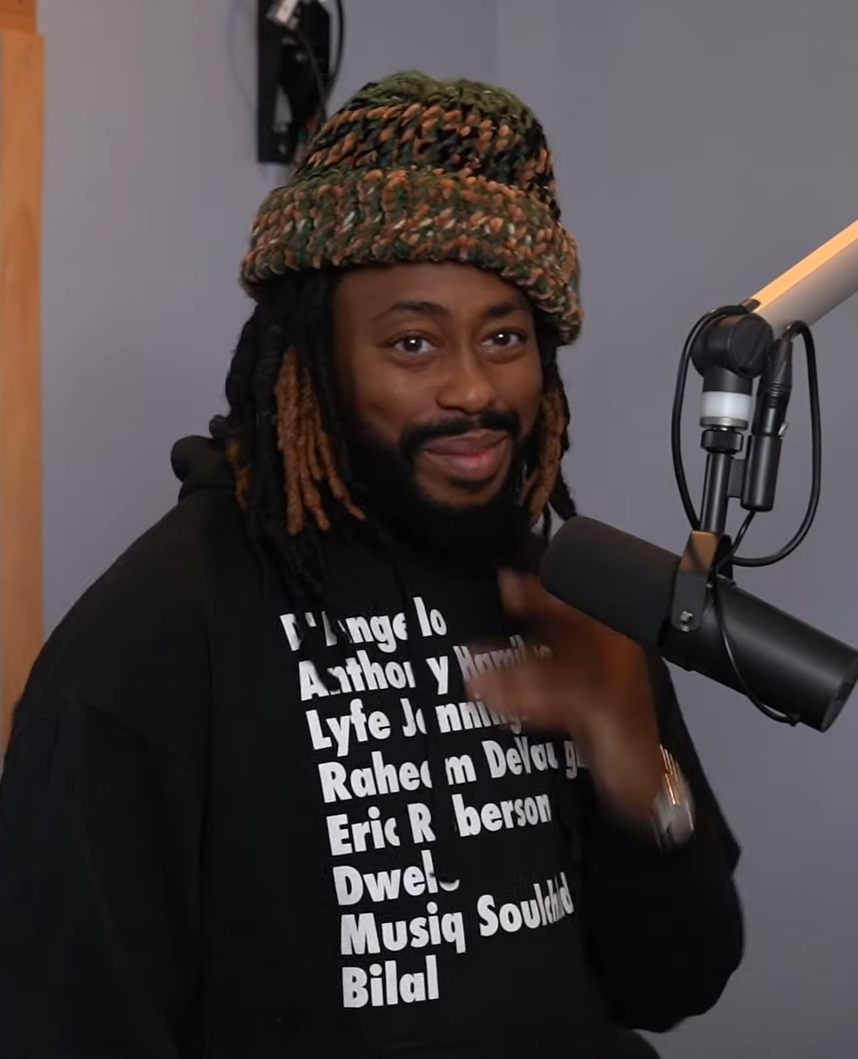
- DeVaughn in 2015
- Studio albums: 12
- Singles: 21
- Collaborative albums: 2

The discography of American R&B singer-songwriter Raheem DeVaughn includes twelve studio albums and 21 singles.

== Albums ==
=== Studio albums ===
List of albums, with selected chart positions
Title	Album details	Peak chart positions								Sales
Title	Album details	US	US R&B	AUS	FRE	CAN	NL	SWE	UK	Sales
The Love Experience	Released: June 28, 2005; Label: Zomba, Jive; Format: CD, digital download	46	9	—	—	—	—	—	—	US: 224,000
Love Behind the Melody	Released: January 15, 2008; Label: Jive; Format: CD, digital download	5	1	—	—	—	—	—	—	
The Love & War MasterPeace	Released: March 2, 2010; Label: Zomba, Jive; Format: CD, digital download	9	3	—	—	—	—	—	—	
A Place Called Love Land	Released: September 3, 2013; Label: Mass Appeal Entertainment, INgrooves, Fontana Distribution; Format: CD, digital download	22	9	—	—	—	—	—	—	US: 52,000
Love Sex Passion	Released: February 17, 2015; Label: E1 Music; Format: CD, digital download	31	4	—	—	—	—	—	—	
Decade of a Love King	Released: October 19, 2018; Label: DeVaughn Enterprises; Format: CD, digital download	— (Note: Decade of a Love King reached number 95 on Billboard's United States Top Current Albums chart, not the regular Billboard 200 that also includes catalog albums in addition to current records.)	—	—	—	—	—	—	—	
The Love Reunion	Released: June 28, 2019; Label: SoNo Recording Group; Format: CD, digital download	—	—	—	—	—	—	—	—	
What A Time To Be In Love	Released: November 20, 2020; Label: SoNo Recording Group; Format: CD, digital download	—	—	—	—	—	—	—	—	
The Summer of Love	Released: June 21, 2023; Label: New Era Soul Records/DMG; Format: digital download	—	—	—	—	—	—	—	—	
Fall in Love	Released: November 21, 2023; Label: New Era Soul Records; Format: digital download	—	—	—	—	—	—	—	—	
Winter in Love	Released: February 13, 2026; Label: New Era Soul Records; Format: digital download	—	—	—	—	—	—	—	—	
Quiet Storm Lover Tome Un	Released: March 6, 2026; Label: UnitedMasters; Format: digital download	—	—	—	—	—	—	—	—	

=== Collaboration albums ===
List of albums, with selected chart positions
Title	Album details	Peak chart positions								Sales
Title	Album details	US	US R&B	AUS	FRE	CAN	NL	SWE	UK	Sales
Lovesick (with Apollo Brown)	Released: June 4, 2021; Label: Mello Music Group; Format: CD, digital download	—	—	—	—	—	—	—	—	
Back 2 Love (with Bee Boy$oul)	Released: January 21, 2022; Label: New Era Soul; Format: digital download	—	—	—	—	—	—	—	—	

== Singles ==
=== As lead artist ===
Year	Single	Chart positions			Album
Year	Single	US	US R&B	US Adult R&B	Album
2005	"Guess Who Loves You More"	—	38	—	The Love Experience
2005	"Believe"	—	118	—	The Love Experience
2006	"You"	—	53	18	The Love Experience
2007	"Woman"	96	17	1	Love Behind the Melody
2008	"Customer"	76	12	24	Love Behind the Melody
2008	"Text Messages"	—	—	—	Love Behind the Melody
2009	"Bulletproof" (featuring Ludacris)	—	46	—	The Love & War MasterPeace
2010	"I Dont Care"	—	36	—	The Love & War MasterPeace
2010	"B.O.B."	—	—	—	The Love & War MasterPeace
2013	"Love Connection"	—	—	—	A Place Called Love Land
2013	"Ridiculous"	—	—	—	A Place Called Love Land
2014	"Queen"	—	—	10	Love Sex Passion
2015	"Temperature's Rising"	—	—	14	Love Sex Passion
2018	"Don't Come Easy"	—	—	5	Decade of a Love King
2018	"What It Feels Like"	—	—	—	Decade of a Love King
2019	"Belongs 2 You" (featuring Rob Hill, Sr.)	—	—	—	Non-album single
2019	"Just Right"	—	—	—	The Love Reunion
2019	"Rose Gold"	—	—	—	The Love Reunion
2020	"Marvin Used To Say"	—	—	—	What A Time To Be In Love
2020	"Mr. Midnight"	—	—	—	What A Time To Be In Love
2020	"Twilight"	—	—	—	What A Time To Be In Love

=== As featured artist ===
Year	Single	Chart positions			Album
Year	Single	US	US R&B	US Hot Adult R&B	Album
2007	"My Soul's Not 4 Sale" (DJ Jazzy Jeff featuring Raheem DeVaughn)	—	107	35	The Return of the Magnificent
2020	"Frontline" (Syleena Johnson featuring Raheem DeVaughn)	—	—	—	Woman and The Making Of A Woman: The Deluxe Edition

== Guest appearances ==
List of non-single guest appearances, with other performing artists, showing year released and album name
Title	Year	Other artist(s)	Album(s)
"My Peoples"	2002	DJ Jazzy Jeff	The Magnificent
"Love Saviour"	2002	DJ Jazzy Jeff, Flo Brown	The Magnificent
"In Time"	2002	DJ Jazzy Jeff, V, Masters at Work	The Magnificent
"Spectacular"	2005	Wale	Paint a Picture
"Another Day" (credited as Chronkite)	2006	Kenn Starr, Sean Born	Starr Status
"My Soul Ain't for Sale"	2007	DJ Jazzy Jeff	The Return of the Magnificent
"Country Cousins"	2007	Talib Kweli, UGK	Eardrum
"Real Women"	2007	UGK, Talib Kweli	Underground Kingz
"Wait on Me"	2007	Guru	Guru's Jazzmatazz, Vol. 4: The Hip Hop Jazz Messenger: Back to the Future
"Rain (Bridge)"	2007	Beanie Sigel, Scarface	The Solution
"Prayer"	2007	Beanie Sigel	The Solution
"Touchdown"	2008	Game	LAX
"Reality Show"	2008	T-Pain, Musiq Soulchild, Jay Lyriq	Three Ringz
"Still on the Grind"	2009	UGK	UGK 4 Life
"Da Slumz"	2009	Malik Yusef, Kumasi, Bun B	G.O.O.D. Morning, G.O.O.D. Night
"Mornin' Rise"	2009	De La Soul	Are You In?: Nike+ Original Run
"Do Over", "Baby"	2009	Ghostface Killah	Ghostdini: Wizard of Poetry in Emerald City
"Lie to You"	2010	Stat Quo, Devin the Dude	Statlanta
"Mr. Incredible - Ms. Unforgettable"	2010	Leela James	My Soul
"Call Me Crazy"	2010	Skillz	The World Needs More Skillz
"Backroads"	2010	Pastor Troy	King of All Kings
"Dim the Lights"	2010	Dwele	W.ants W.orld W.omen
"Players Ballad"	2011	Big K.R.I.T.	Return of 4Eva
"We All Will Know"	2011	Kindred the Family Soul	Love Has No Recession
"Sooner Than Later"	2011	Los	Shooter
"Give It to Me"	2011	Saigon	The Greatest Story Never Told
"Take It Slow"	2011	Logic	Young Sinatra
"From the Hills"	2011	Raekwon, Method Man	Shaolin vs. Wu-Tang
"Thoughts Weigh"	2012	Casey Veggies	Customized Greatly Vol. 3
"Rollin'"	2012	E-40, Mugzi, Laroo T.H.H., Work Dirty, Droop-E, Decadez	The Block Brochure: Welcome to the Soil 1
"Salute You"	2012	E-40	The Block Brochure: Welcome to the Soil 3
"Thru the Struggle"	2012	Styles P, Curren$y	The Diamond Life Project
"Smoked Out"	2012	David Banner, Bun B	Sex, Drugs and Video Games
"Non Fiction"	2012	Rapsody, Ab-Soul	The Idea of Beautiful
"Smoke Good"	2012	Phil Da Phuture	Louder Than You
"Drew & Derwin"	2012	Skyzoo	A Dream Deferred
"Hollands (I Made It)"	2012	Da Kid Daytona	The Lost Luggage
"All the Way"	2012	Actual Proof	Black Boy Radio
"Mr. Safety"	2012	The World Famous Tony Williams, Stokley Williams	King or the Fool
"Nightmares of Being Broke"	2013	Los	Becoming King
"If Love Is"	2013	Tony Yayo	Godfather of the Ghetto
"The Unraveling"	2014	The Roots	…And Then You Shoot Your Cousin
"Tomorrow"	2014	The Roots	…And Then You Shoot Your Cousin
"Rube Boy Hip Hop'"	2014	Styles P	Phantom and the Ghost
"Stay Sippin'"	2014	Traci Braxton	Crash & Burn
"Home"	2014	HHP	Motswako High School
"In the Night"	2015	Curren$y, Chase N. Cashe	Cathedral
"Triumph (Welcome To IV Life)"	2015	Ro Spit	IV Life...
"Bennie & Stella"	2016	Freeway	Free Will
"LAX"	2016	Wale	Summer on Sunset
"Magnolia"	2017	David Banner, Cee-Lo Green	The God Box
"AK"	2017	David Banner, Big Rube	The God Box
"Need to Know"	2019	Various	Soul Togetherness
"Next to You"	2019	Diamond D, Wes Felton	The Diam Piece 2
"My Soul Ain't for Sale"	2020	Ronnie Herel	Neo Soul Sessions Vol. 1
"Deja Vu"	2021	Reel People	Hearts Collide
