= Bulletproof (Raheem DeVaughn song) =

Single by Raheem DeVaughn featuring Ludacris

from the album The Love & War MasterPeace
- Released: September 22, 2009
- Recorded: 2009
- Genre: R&B; hip hop
- Length: 4:44
- Label: Jive Records
- Songwriters: Bridges; DeVaughn; Gonzalez; Mayfield

Raheem DeVaughn singles chronology
"Text Messages" (2008)	"Bulletproof" (2009)	"I Don't Care" (2010)

Ludacris singles chronology
"Addicted to Money" (2009)	"Bulletproof" (2009)	"Regret" (2009)

"Bulletproof" is a song by American singer Raheem DeVaughn, it is the first single from his third studio album, The Love & War MasterPeace (2010). This song features rapper Ludacris, and samples Curtis Mayfield's "The Other Side of Town".

== Music video ==
The music video was directed by Todd Angkasuwan and released across the web via DeVaughn's blog on October 23, 2009. It premiered on BET on December 8, 2009.

== Charts ==
=== Weekly charts ===
Chart (2009)	Peak position
US Hot R&B/Hip-Hop Songs (Billboard)	46
