= The Block Brochure: Welcome to the Soil 2 =

Studio album by E-40
- Released: March 26, 2012
- Recorded: 2011–2012
- Genre: Hip hop
- Length: 71:40
- Label: Heavy on the Grind; EMI
- Producer: Trend; DJ Fresh (producer); T-Pain; Sam Bostic; ReeceBeats; Droop-E; Scorp Dezel; THX; Aaron Harris; Mike Mosely; Rick Rock; Willy Will; Fastraks; C-Ballin; JohnG; Haze; Nonstop Da Hitman

E-40 chronology
The Block Brochure: Welcome to the Soil 1 (2012)	The Block Brochure: Welcome to the Soil 2 (2012)	The Block Brochure: Welcome to the Soil 3 (2012)

Singles from The Block Brochure: Welcome to the Soil 2
- 1. "Function" Released: February 17, 2012

Professional ratings
Review scores
Source	Rating
AllMusic	3/5 stars
The A.V. Club	C
Dusted Magazine	80/100
Fact Magazine	3.5/5 stars
Pitchfork Media	7.9/10
RapReviews	6.5/10 stars
Spectrum Culture	2/5 stars
Totally Dublin	4.5/5 stars

The Block Brochure: Welcome to the Soil 2 is the sixteenth studio album by American rapper E-40. It was released on March 26, 2012, by Heavy on the Grind Entertainment and EMI. His fifteenth and seventeenth albums, The Block Brochure: Welcome to the Soil 1 and The Block Brochure: Welcome to the Soil 3, were also released on the same day.

The album has 18 tracks, along with 2 bonus tracks, and it features YG, Twista, T-Pain, Spice 1, Celly Cel, JT the Bigga Figga, C-Bo, Tech N9ne, Brotha Lynch Hung, Cellski, Andre Nickatina, T-Nutty and Suga-T among others. In addition, Butch Cassidy and Dorrough are featured on the two bonus tracks.

The album's first single is "Function", featuring YG, Iamsu! and Problem, released on February 17, 2012. It peaked at #1 on the Bubbling Under Hot 100 Singles chart and #62 on the Hot R&B/Hip-Hop Songs chart and #42 on the Rap Songs chart. The music video was released on March 6. A video for "Zombie" featuring Tech N9ne, Kung Fu Vampire & Brotha Lynch Hung was released on May 11, while one for "I'm Laced" was released July 6, 2012.

Two commercials were released in March 2012 to promote the Block Brochure album series. The second volume scored a 68/100 on Metacritic, indicating "generally positive reviews". It is the lowest of the three volumes.

== Commercial performance ==
The volume debuted at #58 on the Billboard 200, and at #9 on the Hot R&B/Hip-hop albums chart. As of April 18, 2012, the album has sold 13,000 copies in US.

== Track listing ==
No.	Title	Producer(s)	Length
1.	"I'm Laced"	DJ Fresh	3:00
2.	"On the Case"	Chris "THX" Goodman	3:37
3.	"Function" (featuring YG, Iamsu! & Problem)	Trend	4:19
4.	"Tryna Get It" (featuring Twista & T-Pain)	JohnG; Haze	3:07
5.	"Street Nigga"	Scorp Dezel	3:12
6.	"The Other Day Ago" (featuring Spice 1 & Celly Cel)	Mike Mosley; Sam Bostic	3:52
7.	"This Is the Life" (featuring Sam Bostic)	Sam Bostic	4:11
8.	"Sell Everything"	Rick Rock	4:30
9.	"My Life" (featuring R.O.D.)	Sam Bostic	3:32
10.	"Grey Skies" (featuring Deltrice)	ReeceBeats	3:44
11.	"With the Shit" (featuring JT the Bigga Figga & Cellski)	Droop-E	3:26
12.	"Hittin' A Lick" (featuring C-Bo & T-Nutty)	Fastraks	4:56
13.	"This Shit Hard"	Droop-E	3:14
14.	"Scorpio" (featuring Tech N9ne & London)	Willy Will	4:34
15.	"Red & Blue Lights"	Rick Rock	4:22
16.	"Zombie" (featuring Tech N9ne & Brotha Lynch Hung)	J2 Muzik	3:50
17.	"Memory Lane" (featuring Andre Nickatina)	Droop-E	4:40
18.	"I Know I Can Make It" (featuring Suga-T & Agerman)	Aaron Harris	5:27
Total length:			71:40

iTunes Bonus Track
No.	Title	Producer(s)	Length
19.	"I Can Do Without You" (featuring Butch Cassidy)	Nonstop Da Hitman	4:17
20.	"I'm Doin' It" (featuring Dorrough)	C-Ballin	4:18
Total length:			80:16

=== Notes ===
- Cousin Fik is not credited in "I'm Laced" and "This Shit Hard".
- Stressmatic is not credited in "The Other Day Ago", "Sell Everything" and "Hittin' a Lick".
- Kung Fu Vampire has a cameo in the "Zombie" music video, but he was not involved in the production of the song.

Sample credits

- "I'm Laced" - Contains a sample of "Ballaholic" by E-40

== Charts ==
Chart (2012)	Peak position
US Billboard 200	58
US Top R&B/Hip-Hop Albums (Billboard)	9
US Top Rap Albums (Billboard)	8
US Independent Albums (Billboard)	9
