= The Block Brochure: Welcome to the Soil 3 =

Studio album by E-40
- Released: March 26, 2012
- Recorded: 2011–12
- Genre: Hip hop
- Length: 73:45
- Label: Heavy on the Grind; EMI
- Producer: E-40 (exec.); Droop-E (also exec.); DJ Fresh; Warren G; Willy Will; The 8thgraders; C. Ballin; DecadeZ; DJ Silk; DJ Toure; THX; Rick Rock; Deli; DJ Mustard; Fastracks

E-40 chronology
The Block Brochure: Welcome to the Soil 2 (2012)	The Block Brochure: Welcome to the Soil 3 (2012)	History: Function Music (2012)

The Block Brochure: Welcome to the Soil 3 is the seventeenth studio album by American rapper E-40. It was released on March 26, 2012, by Heavy on the Grind Entertainment and EMI. His fifteenth and sixteenth albums, The Block Brochure: Welcome to the Soil 1 and The Block Brochure: Welcome to the Soil 2, were also released on the same day.

The album features guest appearances from the comedian Katt Williams and the American singer-songwriter Raheem DeVaughn, with the rappers Snoop Dogg, Tha Dogg Pound, Kokane, Kendrick Lamar, Droop-E, Too Short, Kaveo, Stressmatic, B-Legit, Willy Will and Hieroglyphics, among others.

== Promotion ==
The music video for "Be You" featuring Too Short and J Banks, was released on March 29, 2012. The music video for "What Happened to Them Days" was released on April 5, 2012. The music video for "Catch a Fade" featuring Kendrick Lamar and Droop-E, was released on May 14, 2012. The music video for "What You Smokin' On" featuring Snoop Dogg, Tha Dogg Pound and Kokane, was released on May 23, 2012. The music video for "Wasted" featuring Cousin Fik, was released on August 7, 2012.

== Commercial performance ==
Professional ratings
Review scores
Source	Rating
AllMusic	3.5/5 stars
The A.V. Club	B−
Dusted	80/100
Fact	3.5/5 stars
Pitchfork Media	7.9/10
RapReviews	7.5/10 stars
Spectrum Culture	3/5 stars
This Beat Goes	4/5 stars
Totally Dublin	4.5/5 stars

In March 2012, two commercials were released to promote The Block Brochure: Welcome to the Soil series. The third volume scored 76/100 on Metacritic, indicating "generally positive reviews". The Block Brochure: Welcome to the Soil 3 debuted at number 71 on the US Billboard 200, and number 13 on the US Billboard's Top R&B/Hip-Hop Albums.

== Track listing ==
No.	Title	Producer(s)	Length
1.	"Jealous"	Rick Rock	5:05
2.	"Wasted" (featuring Cousin Fik)	C. Ballin	3:37
3.	"What You Smokin' On" (featuring Snoop Dogg, Tha Dogg Pound and Kokane)	DJ Silk	4:12
4.	"Making My Rounds"	C. Ballin	3:41
5.	"Catch a Fade" (featuring Kendrick Lamar and Droop-E)	Droop-E	4:08
6.	"Be You" (featuring Too Short and J Banks)	THX	5:01
7.	"It's Curtains" (featuring Kaveo and Droop-E)	Fastracks	3:06
8.	"Stove on High" (featuring Stressmatic)	Rick Rock	4:24
9.	"Get Loose" (featuring Cousin Fik and Droop-E)	DJ Fresh	3:33
10.	"Gargoyle Serenade"	Rick Rock	2:48
11.	"Pussy Loud" (featuring Cool Nutz and Maniac Loc)	Deli	4:10
12.	"I Ain't Doin' Nothin'" (featuring B-Legit and Willy Will)	Willy Will	4:01
13.	"What Happened to Them Days"	Warren G	4:30
14.	"I'm on His Top"	DecadeZ	2:47
15.	"Get Ya Weight Up" (featuring Katt Williams)	Rick Rock	4:52
16.	"Salute You" (featuring Raheem DeVaughn)	The8thgraders	3:57
17.	"40 & Hiero" (featuring Hieroglyphics)	DJ Toure	4:05
18.	"Sidewalk Memorial"	Droop-E	5:39
Total length:			73:45

iTunes bonus tracks
No.	Title	Producer(s)	Length
19.	"Over Here" (featuring Too Short and Droop-E)	DJ Mustard	4:15
20.	"My Whip Hot" (featuring Laroo T.H.H. and DecadeZ)	DecadeZ	3:36
Total length:			81:37

Notes

- "It's Curtains" features an uncredited vocals by Cousin Fik and Work Dirty.
- "Pussy Loud" features an uncredited vocals by Araja.
- "What Happened to Them Days" features an uncredited vocals by J Banks.
- "Get Ya Weight Up" features an uncredited vocals by Turf Talk.

Sample credits

- "What You Smokin' On" contains a sample of "I Love Him" performed by Jean Plum.
- "40 & Hiero" contains a sample of "Here We Go (Live at the Funhouse)" performed by Run–D.M.C., and "La Di Da Di" performed by Doug E. Fresh and Slick Rick.

== Charts ==
Chart (2012)	Peak position
US Billboard 200	71
US Top R&B/Hip-Hop Albums (Billboard)	13
US Top Rap Albums (Billboard)	12
US Independent Albums (Billboard)	12
