= The Block Brochure: Welcome to the Soil 1 =

Studio album by E-40
- Released: March 26, 2012
- Recorded: 2011–2012
- Genre: Hip hop
- Length: 75:11
- Label: Heavy on the Grind; EMI
- Producer: E-40 (exec.); Bangladesh; Tone Bone; C-Ballin; Sam Bostic; Rick Rock; Jelly Roll; AJ; The 8thgraders; Black Key Beats; Droop-E; DJ Toure; Mike Mosely; Bosko

E-40 chronology
| Revenue Retrievin': Graveyard Shift (2011) | The Block Brochure: Welcome to the Soil 1 (2012) | The Block Brochure: Welcome to the Soil 2 (2012) |

Singles from The Block Brochure: Welcome to the Soil 1
- 1. "Fast Lane" Released: February 12, 2012; 2. "They Point" Released: March 6, 2012; 3. "Turn it Up" Released: March 31, 2012

Professional ratings
Review scores
| Source | Rating |
|---|---|
| AllMusic | 3.5/5 stars |
| The A.V. Club | B |
| Dusted Magazine | 80/100 |
| Fact Magazine | 3.5/5 stars |
| Pitchfork Media | 7.9/10 |
| RapReviews | 7/10 stars |
| Spectrum Culture | 2.5/5 stars |
| This Beat Goes | 4/5 stars |
| Totally Dublin | 4.5/5 stars |

The Block Brochure: Welcome to the Soil 1 is the fifteenth studio album by American rapper E-40. It was released on March 26, 2012, by Heavy on the Grind Entertainment and EMI. His sixteenth and seventeenth albums, The Block Brochure: Welcome to the Soil 2 and The Block Brochure: Welcome to the Soil 3, were also released on the same day.

The album has 18 tracks, along with 2 bonus tracks, and it features Juicy J, 2 Chainz, B-Legit, Richie Rich, Gangsta Boo, Droop-E, The Jacka, Raheem DeVaughn, Mugzi, Turf Talk, and Mistah F.A.B., and Go Hard Black among others.

A behind the scenes for the music video for "They Point" featuring Juicy J and 2 Chainz and produced by Bangladesh was released on February 16, 2012, and the video was released on March 22. The music video for "Fast Lane" was released on the album's release date. On August 1, the video for "Turn It Up" was released. Despite not being released as a single, "In This Thang Breh" featuring Turf Talk and Mistah F.A.B. peaked at #19 on the Bubbling Under R&B/Hip-Hop Songs chart, making it Turf Talk's first and only charting song.

Two commercials were released in March 2012 to promote the Block Brochure album series. The first volume scored a 78/100 on Metacritic, indicating "generally positive reviews". It is the highest of the three volumes. The volume debuted at #59 on the Billboard 200, and at #10 on the Hot R&B/Hip-hop albums chart.

== Track listing ==
| No. | Title | Producer(s) | Length |
|---|---|---|---|
| 1. | "Fast Lane" | Droop-E | 3:26 |
| 2. | "They Point" (featuring Juicy J & 2 Chainz) | Bangladesh | 4:13 |
| 3. | "Rock Stars" | Rick Rock | 4:18 |
| 4. | "Outta Town" (featuring B-Legit & Laroo T.H.H.) | DJ Toure | 5:00 |
| 5. | "What's My Name" | @ToneBonebeats | 3:26 |
| 6. | "Slummin'" | Rick Rock | 2:54 |
| 7. | "Do the Playa" (featuring DecadeZ) | Jelly Roll | 3:31 |
| 8. | "Cutlass" (featuring B-Legit & Richie Rich) | Mike Mosley; Sam Bostic | 4:36 |
| 9. | "Turn It Up" | C-Ballin | 4:02 |
| 10. | "Let's Fuck" (featuring Gangsta Boo) | Droop-E | 4:19 |
| 11. | "Bust Moves" (featuring Droop-E & Big Omeezy) | AJ | 3:52 |
| 12. | "Can You Feel It?" (featuring B-Legit) | Droop-E | 4:34 |
| 13. | "What Is It Over?" (featuring J Banks) | Droop-E | 4:17 |
| 14. | "In the Ghetto" (featuring The Jacka & Rankin Scroo) | Black Key Beats | 5:43 |
| 15. | "Rollin'" (featuring Raheem DeVaughn, Laroo T.H.H., Mugzi, Work Dirty, Droop-E & Decadez) | DJ Toure | 4:25 |
| 16. | "In This Thang Breh" (featuring Turf Talk & Mistah F.A.B.) | @ToneBonebeats | 3:09 |
| 17. | "Mary Jane" (featuring Christian Keez, Cousin Fik & Droop-E) | The 8thgraders | 4:07 |
| 18. | "Help Me" (featuring Mike Marshall & Go Hard Black) | C-Ballin | 5:11 |
| Total length: | | | 75:11 |

iTunes Bonus Track
| No. | Title | Producer(s) | Length |
|---|---|---|---|
| 19. | "Blame It on the DJ" (featuring C-Ballin) | C-Ballin | 4:05 |
| 20. | "Beatin' the Trunk Loose" | Bosko | 4:18 |
| Total length: | | | 83:35 |

=== Notes ===
- Stressmatic is not credited on "Rock Stars" and "Cutlass"
- Cousin Fik, Christian Real Keez and Droop-E are not credited on the iTunes version of "Mary Jane"
- "Bust Moves" heavily samples "Going Back to Cali" by the Notorious B.I.G.

== Charts ==
| Chart (2012) | Peak position |
|---|---|
| US Billboard 200 | 69 |
| US Top R&B/Hip-Hop Albums (Billboard) | 10 |
| US Top Rap Albums (Billboard) | 9 |
| US Independent Albums (Billboard) | 10 |
