= Love Behind the Melody =

Studio album by Raheem DeVaughn
- Released: January 15, 2008
- Length: 65:51
- Label: Jive; Zomba
- Producer: Mark Batson; Blaq Smurph; Carvin & Ivan; Bryan-Michael Cox; Kenny "Dope" Gonzalez; Kwamé; One Up Entertainment; Jack Splash; Scott Storch; Chucky Thompson

Raheem DeVaughn chronology
The Love Experience (2005)	Love Behind the Melody (2008)	The Love & War MasterPeace (2010)

Singles from Love Behind the Melody
- 1. "Woman" Released: September 25, 2007; 2. "Customer" Released: 2008; 3. "Text Messages" Released: 2008

Love Behind the Melody is the second studio album by American R&B singer Raheem DeVaughn. It was released on January 15, 2008 through Jive Records. The album was preceded by three singles, "Woman", "Customer" and "Text Messages".

== Critical reception ==
Professional ratings
Aggregate scores
Source	Rating
Metacritic	83/100
Review scores
Source	Rating
About.com	4/5 stars
Allmusic	4/5 stars
Entertainment Weekly	A−
PopMatters	8/10
USA Today	3.5/4 stars

Upon its release, Love Behind the Melody received rave reviews from music critics. At Metacritic, which assigns a normalized rating out of 100 to reviews from mainstream critics, the album received an average score of 83, which indicates "universal acclaim," based on nine reviews.

AllMusic editor Andy Kellman called the album "a significant improvement over The Love Experience in every respect – somehow displaying an increase in both modesty and ambition, as well as offering a more refined yet bolder set of material. Whether or not DeVaughn goes gold, you can bank on at least a couple major R&B artists going into the studio throughout the remainder of 2008 wanting to come out with something as hot and imaginative as this." Steve Jones form USA Today wrote that DeVaughn's "airy vocals recall vintage R&B stars, while contemporary hip-hop and rock flavors along with artful, insightful lyrics on love and life create an intriguing sound. Over the years, the Washington, D.C., native has built an impressive word-of-mouth reputation with his live shows. Melody should give a broader audience an idea what the talk’s all about." Ebony's Shirley Henderson noted that the album was "laced with strong guitar performances and messages of social consciousness."

In his review for Vibe, Keith Murphy found that "DeVaughn does come to his senses to deliver the type of grown and love-starved balladry he excels at on the alluring "Desire," a slow cut that owes more to the romanticism of Will Downing than today’s lay-and-slay R&B male vocalists [...] Finally, the lover-man is back." The Boston Globe found that "after his 2005 debut, DeVaughn ups the ante with a sprawling effort that works as a showcase for his lush vocals. In an era of studio-created voices, this is a step-back-and-listen-to-him-blow disc." The New York Times critic Kelefa Sanneh called DeVaughn "a slow-jam specialist with a mellow voice and a restrained approach." While she dismissed Kenny Dope's contributions to the album as "meandering," she praised DeVaughn for his influences, writing that he "borrows judiciously from Prince, Marvin Gaye and others, relying on his voice to keep the songs on track. Even when he’s promising to “shut the club down," his delivery promises something calmer and sweeter than a wild night out."

== Chart performance ==
Love Behind the Melody debuted and peaked at number five on the US Billboard 200, selling about 45,000 copies in its first week. It also debuted atop the Top R&B/Hip-Hop Albums chart.

== Track listing ==
Love Behind the Melody track listing
No.	Title	Writer(s)	Producer(s)	Length
1.	"Hello Love (Intro)"	Raheem DeVaughn; James Preston; Kenny "Dope" Gonzalez	Gonzalez	0:59
2.	"Woman"	DeVaughn; Carl "Chucky" Thompson	Thompson	4:28
3.	"Love Drug"	DeVaughn; Scott Storch	Storch	4:58
4.	"Energy" (featuring Big Boi)	DeVaughn; Antwan Patton; Storch	Storch	3:24
5.	"Friday (Shut The Club Down)"	DeVaughn; Kwamé Holland; Smokey Robinson; Ronald White	Kwamé	3:39
6.	"Customer"	DeVaughn; Ivan Barias; Carvin Haggins; Johnnie "Smurf" Smith; Kristal Oliver	Carvin & Ivan	4:05
7.	"Mo' Better"	DeVaughn; Jack Splash	Splash	7:39
8.	"Woman I Desire (Interlude)" (featuring Malik Yusef)	DeVaughn; Yusef; Preston; Gonzalez	Gonzalez	2:14
9.	"Desire"	DeVaughn; Selan Lerner; Gonzalez	Gonzalez	5:29
10.	"Midnight (Interlude)"	DeVaughn; Preston; Gonzalez	Gonzalez	1:30
11.	"Marathon" (featuring Floetry)	DeVaughn; Natalie Stewart; Lerner; Gonzalez	Gonzalez	5:45
12.	"Butterflies"	DeVaughn; Mark Batson	Batson	3:10
13.	"She's Not You"	DeVaughn; Rich Shelton; Kevin Veney; Loren Hill	One Up Entertainment	4:14
14.	"Can We Try Again? (Interlude)"	DeVaughn; Preston; Gonzalez	Gonzalez	0:52
15.	"Try Again"	DeVaughn; Batson	Batson	3:36
16.	"Empty"	DeVaughn; Bryan-Michael Cox	Cox	4:50
17.	"Four Letter Word"	DeVaughn; Courtney Dwight	Blaq Smurph	4:45
Total length:				65:51

Deluxe edition (bonus tracks)
No.	Title	Writer(s)	Producer(s)	Length
18.	"Text Messages"	DeVaughn; B.D. Terry; C. Lewis; Clarence Williams; Jerry Vines; John Davis; N. Bain	Big Bob; Capt'n Curt; Chris Symfonikz	3:23
19.	"Customer (Remix)" (featuring R. Kelly)	DeVaughn; Barias; Haggins; Smith; Oliver	Carvin & Ivan	4:01
20.	"Rich Girls" (featuring Too Short)	DeVaughn; Todd Shaw; Batson	Batson	3:33
21.	"Woman" (music video)			3:56
22.	"Interview"

Reissue bonus tracks
No.	Title	Writer(s)	Producer(s)	Length
18.	"Text Messages"	DeVaughn; Terry; Lewis; Williams; Vines; Davis; Bain	Big Bob; Capt'n Curt; Chris Symfonikz	3:23
19.	"Customer (Remix)" (featuring R. Kelly)	DeVaughn; Barias; Haggins; Smith; Oliver	Carvin & Ivan	4:01

== Charts ==
=== Weekly charts ===
Weekly chart performance for Love Behind the Melody
Chart (2008)	Peak position
US Billboard 200	5
US Top R&B/Hip-Hop Albums (Billboard)	1

=== Year-end charts ===
Year-end chart performance for Love Behind the Melody
Chart (2008)	Position
US Billboard 200	161
US Top R&B/Hip-Hop Albums (Billboard)	22
