= A Place Called Love Land =

Studio album by Raheem DeVaughn
- Released: September 3, 2013
- Recorded: 2011–2013
- Genre: R&B
- Length: 53:34
- Labels: Mass Appeal Entertainment, INgrooves, Fontana Distribution
- Producers: Carvin & Ivan, Christopher Barnes, Kristal Oliver, Dre King, Jay Phoenix, Jerrol "Boogie" Wizzard, Mario Winans, Mo Digga, Adonis, R.C. Williams, Boney James, Ryan M. Tedder, Jah-Born, Phil Davis

Raheem DeVaughn chronology
The Love & War MasterPeace (2010)	A Place Called Love Land (2013)	Love Sex Passion (2015)

Singles from A Place Called Love Land
- 1. "Love Connection" Released: February 14, 2013

A Place Called Love Land is the fourth studio album by American recording artist Raheem DeVaughn. The album was released on September 3, 2013, by Mass Appeal Entertainment, INgrooves and Fontana Distribution.

== Singles ==
The first single "Love Connection" was released on February 14, 2013. On April 16, 2013, the music video was released for "Love Connection".

== Critical response ==
Professional ratings
Review scores
Source	Rating
AllMusic	4/5 stars

A Place Called Love Land was met with generally positive reviews from music critics. Andy Kellman of AllMusic gave the album four out of five stars, saying "No matter how boastful DeVaughn gets, a listener can feel as if she's being addressed directly pretty much all the way through. Even when DeVaughn sings 'On the phone saying I love her, but in the bathroom there's another,' as he does on 'Wrong Forever,' it's done as repentance. It's surprising that the newly independent DeVaughn, whose transition to a smaller budget is sonically transparent, doesn't let loose with some freewheeling funk like 'Lose Control.' That said, the throbbing 'Love Connection,' released as a single several months prior to the album, is his best uptempo song, as well as one of his catchiest concoctions. It didn't gain traction with radio -- a major shame." Joe Warminsky of the Washington City Paper gave the album a positive review, saying "For anybody who was particularly jazzed by DeVaughn’s pre-election, let’s-march-then-ball-all-night vibe, the album might seem a little lightweight. But it’s a logical career move, a way to get back to basics while adjusting to the freedom that his new deal is said to offer him. The squishier passages—which never really cross into X-rated territory, perhaps because DeVaughn has the mass market in mind—are simply reminders that R&B should serve every facet of a relationship, even the foot rubs."

== Commercial performance ==
The album debuted and peaked at number 22 on the US Billboard 200 chart.

== Track listing ==
No.	Title	Writer(s)	Producer(s)	Length
1.	"Interlude - Album Intro"	Raheem DeVaughn, Christopher Barnes	Christopher Barnes, Ivan Barias	0:53
2.	"Love Connection"	DeVaughn, Ivan "Orthodox" Barias, Kristal Oliver	Carvin & Ivan, Kristal Oliver	4:00
3.	"Wrong Forever"	Barias, Kristal "Tytewriter" Oliver	Carvin & Ivan	3:30
4.	"Interlude - Don't Go"	DeVaughn, DeAndre Shaifer	Dre King	1:56
5.	"Complicated"	Barias, Carvin Haggins, Johnnie Smith, C. Latif Williams	Carvin & Ivan	4:23
6.	"In the Meantime"	Jay Fenix, Terrell Roper, Durrell Scott	Jay Phoenix	2:56
7.	"Interlude - Rebirth"	DeVaughn, DeAndre Shaifer	Dre King	1:03
8.	"Ridiculous"	Shaffer Smith	Jerrol "Boogie" Wizzard, Ryan M. Tedder (co.)	4:56
9.	"Pink Crush Velvet"	DeVaughn, Tommie McGlauflin, Ryan Toby, Mario Winans	Mario Winans	3:51
10.	"Interlude - Dear Love Queen" (featuring Jazz of Dru Hill)	DeVaughn, Mo Digga	Mo Digga	1:43
11.	"Greatest Love"	DeVaughn, Maurice Randolph	Mo Digga	5:44
12.	"Cry Baby"	DeVaughn, George Clay, Meshawn Jones, Adonis Shropshire	Adonis	4:09
13.	"Make a Baby"	DeVaughn, Jahmal Cantero, R.C. Williams	R.C. Williams, Jah-Born	5:15
14.	"Make Em Like You"	DeVaughn, Shaifer	Dre King	3:56
15.	"Interlude - Happy"	DeVaughn, Shaifer	Dre King	1:35
16.	"Maker Of Love" (featuring Boney James)	DeVaughn, Phil Davis, Boney James	Boney James, Phil Davis (co.)	3:46

Target deluxe edition bonus tracks
No.	Title	Writer(s)	Producer(s)	Length
17.	"True Love"	Dave Hampton, Patrick Clay Murphy Jr., Damiel Blackstone	Dave Hampton, Patrick Clay Murphy Jr.	4:50
18.	"You Saved Me from Myself"	Michael Vajna, DeVaughn	Crada	3:43

== Charts ==
=== Weekly charts ===
Chart (2013)	Peak position
US Billboard 200	22
US Top R&B/Hip-Hop Albums (Billboard)	9
US Independent Albums (Billboard)	2

=== Year-end charts ===
Chart (2013)	Position
US Top R&B/Hip-Hop Albums (Billboard)	94
