= The Love Experience =

Studio album by Raheem DeVaughn
- Released: June 28, 2005
- Length: 73:03
- Label: Jive
- Producer: Emmai Alquiva; Anthony Bell; Big Bob; Kev Brown; The Collective; Cap't Curt; Raheem DeVaughn; Dope; Fanatic; Terry Hunter; Cliff Jones; K-Murdock; Pete Kuzma; Jerry "Juke" Vines; Steve "Supe" White

Raheem DeVaughn chronology
The Love Experience (2005)	Love Behind the Melody (2008)

Singles from The Love Experience
- 1. "Guess Who Loves You More" Released: February 15, 2005

The Love Experience is the debut studio album by American singer Raheem DeVaughn. It was released on June 28, 2005 by Jive Records. DeVaughn who wrote or co-wrote every track on the album, worked with a variety of musicians on the album, including Kenny "Dope" Gonzalez, Andreao "Fanatic" Heard, Terry Hunter, and K-Murdock. The album cover was photographed by Daniel Hastings, who was known primarily for his work on seminal 1990's East Coast hip hop albums.

Upon its release, the album earned largely positive reviews from music critics. Netting sales of 250,000 units, according to Nielsen SoundScan, it reached number 9 on Billboard Top R&B/Hip-Hop Albums and number 46 on the US Billboard 200. In support of the album, Jive issued several singles, including lead single "Guess Who Loves You More" as well as follow-ups "Believe" and "You," with "Guess Who Loves You More" reaching the top forty of the Hot R&B/Hip-Hop Songs chart.

== Critical reception ==
Professional ratings
Review scores
Source	Rating
AllMusic	3/5 stars

Washington Post critic Mike Joyce noted that "DeVaughn wears his influences with engaging style and brash confidence throughout the entire album, turning his major label debut into something worthy of soul music's major leagues [...] His gift for imaginatively arranging vocal tracks is enough to make him a welcome presence on the airwaves for years to come." Billboard compared DeVaughn to fellow R&B singer D'Angelo and questioned whether he could he replace the latter, writing that "armed with a collection of songs steeped in promises of unconditional adoration and detailing steamy lovemaking sessions, DeVaughn proves himself a worthy contender."

AllMusic editor Andy Kellman found that "through numerous highlights scattered across the disc, it becomes apparent that DeVaughn is remarkably creative and talented and should be watched." While he was critical with the album's length, he praised DeVaughn's vocal performance and the production on the album, further writing: "Vocally, he's not too far from Dwele, with smooth, sweet tones that often drift into an even sweeter falsetto, though he could use a little of his peer's lyrical subtleties. His voice immediately pulls you in, so the shortcoming isn't as much of a factor as it would be with a singer of lesser skill. Most of his inspirations dwell in the '70s, favoring spare arrangements and elegant string flourishes over dramatic bombast and piercing keyboard stabs."

== Chart performance ==
The Love Experience debuted and peaked at number 46 on the US Billboard 200 in the week of September 21, 2005. It also debuted at number nine on the Top R&B/Hip-Hop Albums chart. By January 2008, the album had sold 224,000 copies in the United States, according to Nielsen SoundScan.

== Track listing ==
The Love Experience track listing
No.	Title	Writer(s)	Producer(s)	Length
1.	"The Voice (Intro)"	Raheem DeVaughn; Kyle Murdock	DeVaughn; K-Murdock	0:18
2.	"The Love Experience"	DeVaughn; Steve "Supe" White; Robert DeBarge; Etterlene Jordan	White	3:51
3.	"Guess Who Loves You More"	DeVaughn; Kenneth Gonzalez; Clarence Scarborough	Kenny Dope	5:20
4.	"Who"	DeVaughn; Anthony Bell	Bell	5:05
5.	"Where I Stand"	DeVaughn; Pete Kuzma	Kuzma	5:04
6.	"Breathe"	DeVaughn; Kuzma	Kuzma	4:33
7.	"You"	DeVaughn; Terry Hunter	Hunter	5:02
8.	"Sweet Tooth"	DeVaughn; O. Robinson	Emmai Alaquiva	4:11
9.	"Ask Yourself"	DeVaughn; Charod Barnes; Jerry Barnes; Andreao Heard; Wanya Morris	Fanatic	4:48
10.	"Believe"	DeVaughn; Warren Jones; Issac Lewis; Levi Stevens	Jones; Lewis; Stevens	5:12
11.	"Is It Possible?"	DeVaughn; Kuzma	Kuzma	4:17
12.	"Catch 22"	DeVaughn; Kuzma; Khalif Brown	Kuzma; Brown	4:43
13.	"Until"	DeVaughn; Jerry "Juke" Vines; Cliff Jones; Curtis Williams; Bob Terry; Ronald Isley; Ernie Isley; Marvin Isley; O'Kelly Isley; Rudolph Isley; Chris Jasper	Jones; Vines; Big Bob^{[a]}; Captain Curt^{[a]}	5:09
14.	"Cadillac"	DeVaughn; Vines; Jones; Williams; Terry	Jones; Vines; Big Bob^{[a]}; Captain Curt^{[a]}	4:43
15.	"Green Leaves"	DeVaughn; Vines; Jones; Williams; Terry	Jones; Vines; Big Bob^{[a]}; Captain Curt^{[a]}	2:52
16.	"Thank You"	DeVaughn; W. Ellington Felton; Murdock	DeVaughn; Felton; K-Murdock	5:24
Total length:				73:03

Notes

- ^{^[a]} signifies a co-producer

Samples credits

- "The Love Experience" contains a sample of "My Friend in the Sky", as performed by Switch.
- "Guess Who Loves You More" contains a sample of "Can't Hide Love", as performed by Earth, Wind & Fire.
- "Ask Yourself" contains a sample of "Right on Time", as performed by Boyz II Men.
- "Until" contains a sample of "Footsteps in the Dark", as performed by The Isley Brothers.

== Charts ==
Chart performance for The Love Experience
Chart (2005)	Peak position
US Billboard 200	46
US Top R&B/Hip-Hop Albums (Billboard)	9
