= Love Sex Passion =

Studio album by Raheem DeVaughn
- Released: February 17, 2015
- Recorded: 2013–2014
- Genre: R&B
- Length: 75:45
- Label: 368 Music Group, E1 Music
- Producer: Dre King, Chucky Thompson, Patrick "Guitarboy" Hayes, The Colleagues, Patrick Murphy, Zachariah McGant, Jarius Mozee, Raheem DeVaughn, Aaron Hardin, J.Oliver, Cartier Beats, BJ the Chicago Kid, Federico Peña, Travis Cherry

Raheem DeVaughn chronology
A Place Called Love Land (2013)	Love Sex Passion (2015)	Decade of a Love King (2018)

Singles from Love Sex Passion
- 1. "Queen" Released: September 16, 2014

Love Sex Passion is the fifth studio album by American R&B recording artist Raheem DeVaughn. The album was released on February 17, 2015, by 368 Music Group and E1 Music.

== Commercial performance ==
The album debuted at number 31 on the Billboard 200 chart, with first-week sales of 13,000 copies in the United States.

== Track listing ==
No.	Title	Producer(s)	Length
1.	"Welcum 2 Love, Sex, Passion (Intro)"		0:35
2.	"Black Ice Cream"	The Colleagues	7:03
3.	"Pretty Lady" (featuring Trombone Shorty)	Chucky Thompson; Patrick Murphy; Raheem DeVaughn	3:58
4.	"Queen"	Chucky Thompson	4:00
5.	"Nothing Without You"	Raheem DeVaughn; Zachariah McGant; Aaron Hardin	3:45
6.	"When You Love Somebody"	Cartier Beats; Raheem DeVaughn	6:10
7.	"All I Know (My Heart)"	The Colleagues	4:29
8.	"Terms of Endearment"	The Colleagues	4:39
9.	"Miss Your Sex"	J.Oliver	5:12
10.	"Baby Come Back"	Jarius Mozee; BJ the Chicago Kid	3:30
11.	"Never Never Land"	Federico Peña	5:31
12.	"Temperature's Rising"	Travis Cherry	4:14
13.	"Sun Proof Room (50 Shades)"	Patrick "Guitarboy" Hayes	4:23
14.	"Strip"	Dre King	4:12
15.	"Countdown to Love"	Dre King; Zachariah McGant^{[a]}	4:30
16.	"Feather Rock Lovin'" (featuring Boney James & the Illadelph Horns)	Dre King	4:51
17.	"Infiniti"	The Colleagues	4:43
Total length:			75:45

Notes

- ^{^a} signifies a co-producer.

== Charts ==
=== Weekly charts ===
Chart (2015)	Peak position
US Billboard 200	31
US Top R&B/Hip-Hop Albums (Billboard)	4
US Independent Albums (Billboard)	2

=== Year-end charts ===
Chart (2015)	Position
US Top R&B/Hip-Hop Albums (Billboard)	90
