= Customer (song) =

Single by Raheem DeVaughn

from the album Love Behind the Melody
- Released: 2008
- Recorded: 2007
- Genre: R&B
- Length: 4:08
- Label: Jive/Zomba
- Songwriters: R. Devaughn, R. Kelly, J. Smith, K. Oliver, C. Haggins & I. Barias
- Producers: Carvin & Ivan

Raheem DeVaughn singles chronology
"Woman" (2007)	"Customer" (2008)	"Love Drug" (2008)

"Customer" is a song by American singer Raheem DeVaughn, produced by Carvin & Ivan, is the second single from his second album Love Behind the Melody. It is also Raheem's most popular single and highest-charting single on the Billboard Hot 100, peaking at number 76.

== Remix ==
A remix was released on April 21, 2008. It features American singer and former labelmate R. Kelly and was included on the reissue of Love Behind the Melody.

== Charts ==
=== Weekly charts ===
Chart (2008)	Peak position
US Billboard Hot 100	76
US Adult R&B Songs (Billboard)	24
US Hot R&B/Hip-Hop Songs (Billboard)	11

=== Year-end charts ===
Chart (2008)	Position
US Hot R&B/Hip-Hop Songs (Billboard)	47
