= The Love & War MasterPeace =

Studio album by Raheem DeVaughn
- Released: March 2, 2010
- Length: 66:47
- Labels: Jive; Zomba
- Producers: Carvin & Ivan; Big Bob; Kenny Dope; Jamil "Face" Johnson; Lil' Ronnie; DeAndre Shaifer; Sound of the City Music Group; The Stereotypes; Symfonikz; Jerry "Juke" Vines

Raheem DeVaughn chronology
Love Behind the Melody (2008)	The Love & War MasterPeace (2010)	A Place Called Love Land (2013)

Singles from The Love & War MasterPeace
- 1. "Bulletproof" Released: September 22, 2009; 2. "I Don't Care" Released: January 25, 2010; 3. "B.O.B." Released: June 20, 2010

The Love & War MasterPeace is the third studio album by American singer Raheem DeVaughn. It was released by Jive Records on March 2, 2010. The album was also released as a deluxe edition with an additional disc of bonus material. Recording sessions for the album took place during 2008 to 2009 and production was handled primarily by Kenny "Dope" Gonzalez.

== Background ==
Production for the album was handled primarily by Kenny "Dope" Gonzalez, with contributions from Ne-Yo, Stereotypes, and Lil' Ronnie, among others. In a press release for the album, DeVaughn explained its title, stating "I named the album The Love & War MasterPeace because I feel that where I am as a person and where we are as a people, we are all trying to master that internal peace and happiness in a very strange time." In an interview for Vibe, he described the album as "half socially conscious, half love". In an interview with Pete Lewis of Blues & Soul, DeVaughn discussed his intentions for the album, stating "The plan from the gate was to have the two vibes - social conscience and love/romance. And, with that being definitely something that Marvin Gaye was known for I think that's why I get those comparisons with him."

== Singles ==
The album's lead single, "Bulletproof", was released on September 22, 2009, and features rapper Ludacris. The single charted at number 46 on the U.S. Hot R&B/Hip-Hop Songs, number 64 on the European Hot 100 Singles, and number 48 on the Canadian Hot 100. "Lyin to Myself" was released promotionally on December 1, 2009. Prefixmag reviewed the song praising Raheem for his "lyrics, voice and style." "I Don't Care" was released as the album's second single on January 25, 2010. It spent 20 weeks and peaked at number 36 on the US Hot R&B/Hip-Hop Songs. The album's third single "B.O.B." was released June 20, 2010. The single peaked at number 79 and spent five weeks on the Hot R&B/Hip-Hop Songs chart.

== Critical response ==
Professional ratings
Review scores
Source	Rating
AllMusic	4.5/5 stars
Detroit Free Press	3/4 stars
The Philadelphia Inquirer	3/4 stars
Toronto Star	3.5/4 stars

The Love & War MasterPeace was well received by music critics. Billboard writer Gail Mitchell praised the album's themes and music, writing "Drawing from a palette rich in R&B, hip-hop and jazz, DeVaughn has crafted a powerful, thought-provoking album". Giving it 4 1/2 out of 5 stars, AllMusic writer Andy Kellman cited The Love & War MasterPeace as "one of the most grippingly conscious major-label R&B albums of the last 30 years", viewing its love-themed songs as "imaginative and excellent" and praising its socially conscious material. The Washington Post's Sarah Godfrey called it "a masterpiece" and compared DeVaughn to soul musician Marvin Gaye, writing "like Gaye, he can deliver songs for both babymaking and movement-building". Ken Capobianco of The Boston Globe praised DeVaughn's vocals and called the album a "smartly executed set". Toronto Star writer Ashante Infantry gave it 3 1/2 out of 4 stars and called it "a grooving, unconventional and utterly compelling album".

Despite viewing its thematic concept as flawed, Washington City Paper writer Ben Westhoff praised its "wild ambition" and musical quality, stating "it instead works in the realm of the lush, the dark, and the dramatic, striving for a chiseled-in-granite sound. There’s not a note out of place here; the music is at times sweeping and blustery, at other times cautious and foreboding". Detroit Free Press writer Brian McCollum gave the album 3 out of 4 stars and wrote that it "dances a careful line between oldfangled soul and commercial R&B". Jon Pareles of The New York Times wrote that The Love & War Masterpeace is "destined to be split into separate love and war playlists", but ultimately praised DeVaughn's themes of "social consciousness and seduction", writing "at least Mr. DeVaughn has more than one thing on his mind". The Philadelphia Inquirer's A.D. Amorosi viewed its skits by Dr. Cornel West as "confident and paternal", and wrote that the album "finds DeVaughn embracing his political side with a sociocultural vision that's subtle, sharp, and never loses track of its contagious songcraft".

The album was nominated for a Grammy Award for Best R&B Album, presented at the 53rd Grammy Awards in 2011.

== Commercial performance ==
The album debuted at number nine on the US Billboard 200 chart, with first-week sales of 45,000 copies in the United States. It also entered at number three on Billboard's R&B/Hip-Hop Albums, and reached number 11 on Billboard's Digital Albums chart. It ultimately spent 10 weeks on the Billboard 200 and 36 weeks on the R&B/Hip-Hop Albums. By August 2013, the album had sold 179,000 copies in the United States.

== Track listing ==
Love Behind the Melody track listing
No.	Title	Writer(s)	Producer(s)	Length
1.	"Dr. Cornel West Intro"	Raheem DeVaughn; Kenny Gonzalez	Kenny Dope	1:41
2.	"Bulletproof" (featuring Ludacris)	DeVaughn; Christopher Bridges; Gonzalez; Curtis Mayfield	Dope	4:43
3.	"The Greatness" (featuring Wale)	DeVaughn; Olubowale Akintimehin; Gonzalez; James Preston	Dope	4:10
4.	"I Don't Care"	Shaffer Smith; Jonathan Yip; Ray Romulus; Jeremy Reeves	The Stereotypes; Ne-Yo^{[a]}	4:14
5.	"Black & Blue"	DeVaughn; Ronnie Jackson; Patrick Hayes; Phillip Cornish	Lil' Ronnie	3:34
6.	"Mr. Right"	DeVaughn; Ivan Barias; Carvin Haggins; Leonard "E-Flat" Stephens; Kristal Oliver	Carvin & Ivan	3:29
7.	"Dr. Cornel West Interlude"	DeVaughn; Gonzalez	Dope	1:59
8.	"Fragile" (featuring Malik Yusef)	DeVaughn; Yusef; Gonzalez; Preston	Dope	4:27
9.	"My Wife"	DeVaughn; Gonzalez	Dope	4:11
10.	"B.O.B."	DeVaughn; Bobby D. Terry; Chris "Symfonikz" Lewis; Jerry "Juke" Vines	Symfonikz; Vines; Big Bob	4:37
11.	"Bedroom"	DeVaughn; Gonzalez; Preston	Dope	3:20
12.	"Microphone"	DeVaughn; Jackson; Hayes	Lil' Ronnie	4:41
13.	"Garden of Love"	DeVaughn; Gonzalez; Preston	Dope	6:37
14.	"Dr. Cornel West P.S.A."	DeVaughn; Gonzalez	Dope	2:02
15.	"Nobody Wins a War" (featuring Jill Scott, Bilal, Anthony Hamilton, Algebra, Chrisette Michele, Shelby Johnson, Ledisi, Citizen Cope, Dwele, Chico DeBarge and Rudy Currence)	DeVaughn; Michael Cirincione; Scott; Gonzalez	Dope	7:41
16.	"Revelations 2010" (featuring Damian Marley)	DeVaughn; Marley; Gonzalez; Irving Lorenzo; Albert Johnson; Kejuan Muchita; Shawn Carter; Burt Bacharach; Hal David	Dope	5:21
Total length:				66:47

Deluxe edition – bonus disc
No.	Title	Writer(s)	Producer(s)	Length
1.	"Dr. Cornel West Intro"	DeVaughn; Yusef; Gonzalez; Preston	Dope	1:38
2.	"Wing & a Prayer" (featuring Bun B)	DeVaughn; Renaldo Benson; Val Benson; Bernard Freeman	Jamil "Face" Johnson	4:50
3.	"Dr. Cornel West Interlude"	DeVaughn; Gonzalez	Dope	1:52
4.	"Super Hero"	DeVaughn; Andrae Alexander; Chris Bynum; Karlston Ross; Kenny Martin; Robert McDonald; Vohn Higginbotham	Sound of the City Music Group	5:38
5.	"Soldier Story"	DeVaughn; Gonzalez; Preston	Dope	6:14
6.	"Dr. Cornel West P.S.A."	DeVaughn; Gonzalez	Dope	1:39
7.	"Hopeless Romantic"	DeVaughn; Gonzalez; Preston	Dope	5:07
8.	"Lose Control" (featuring Phil Adé)	DeVaughn; Gonzalez; Preston	Dope	11:08
9.	"Calling Me"	DeVaughn; DeAndre Shaifer	Shaifer	4:36
10.	"XOXO"	DeVaughn; Jackson; Hayes	Lil' Ronnie	3:51
11.	"Dr. Cornel West Outro"	DeVaughn; Gonzalez; Preston	Dope	0:56
12.	"Toes Curl" (iTunes pre-order)	DeVaughn; Bilal Oliver	Bilal	4:21

Notes

- ^{^[a]} signifies a co-producer

Sample credits

- "Bulletproof" contains a sample from "The Other Side of Town" as written and performed by Curtis Mayfield.
- "Revelations 2010" contains samples from Isaac Hayes's "The Look of Love," Mobb Deep's "Survival of the Fittest," and Jay-Z's "Can I Live."
- "Wing & a Prayer" contains a sample from "I Found the Spirit" as performed by The Four Tops.

== Personnel ==
Credits for The Love & War MasterPeace adapted from Allmusic.

=== Musicians ===
- Algebra – vocals
- Eugenia "Chinablac" Bess – background vocals
- Bilal – vocals
- Mike Ciro – bass, guitar, sitar
- Citizen Cope – vocals
- Phil Cornish – keyboards
- Rudy Currence – vocals
- Dave Darlington – keyboards
- Alfredo de la Fé – strings
- Chico DeBarge – vocals
- Raheem DeVaughn – executive producer, vocal arrangement, vocals
- Dwele – vocal arrangement, vocals
- Anthony Hamilton – vocals
- Patrick Hayes – guitar
- Shelby Johnson – vocals
- Debbie Knapper – guitar
- Ledisi – vocals
- Ludacris – vocals
- Damian Marley – vocals
- Chrisette Michele – vocals
- James Preston – keyboards
- Luisito Quintero – percussion
- Jill Scott – vocal arrangement, vocals
- Jerard Snell – drums
- Leonard "E-Flat" Stephens – keyboards
- Wale – vocals
- Shawn Whitley – bass, keyboards
- Malik Yusef – vocals

=== Production ===
- Ivan "Orthodox" Barias – engineer, keyboards, producer, programming
- Leslie Brathwaite – mixing
- DJ Wayne Williams – A&R
- Kenny Dope – producer
- John Drye – mixing
- Jeff Fenster – A&R
- John Frye – mixing
- Carvin "Ransum" Haggins – engineer, producer
- Yas Inoue – engineer
- Ronnie "Lil Ronnie" Jackson – producer
- Jaycen Joshua – mixing
- Jamil "Face" Johnson – engineer
- Larry "Rock" Campbell – A&R
- Chris "Symfonikz" Lewis – programming
- Giancarlo Lino – assistant
- Joyal McNeil – make-up
- Jackie Murphy – art direction
- Ne-Yo – producer
- Richie Owings – prop stylist
- Herb Powers – mastering
- Mike Pratt – assistant
- Tennyson Richards – groomer
- Nick Roache – engineer
- Brea Stinson – stylist
- Randee St. Nicholas – photography
- Stereotypes – producer
- Symfonikz – producer
- Big Bob Terry – producer, programming
- Denise Trotman – art direction, design
- Jerry Vines – executive producer, management, producer

== Charts ==
=== Weekly charts ===
Weekly chart performance for The Love & War MasterPeace
Chart (2010)	Peak position
US Billboard 200	9
US Digital Albums (Billboard)	11
US Top R&B/Hip-Hop Albums (Billboard)	3

=== Year-end charts ===
Year-end chart performance for The Love & War MasterPeace
Chart (2010)	Position
US Top R&B/Hip-Hop Albums (Billboard)	51
