= Raheem DeVaughn =

American singer-songwriter (born 1975)

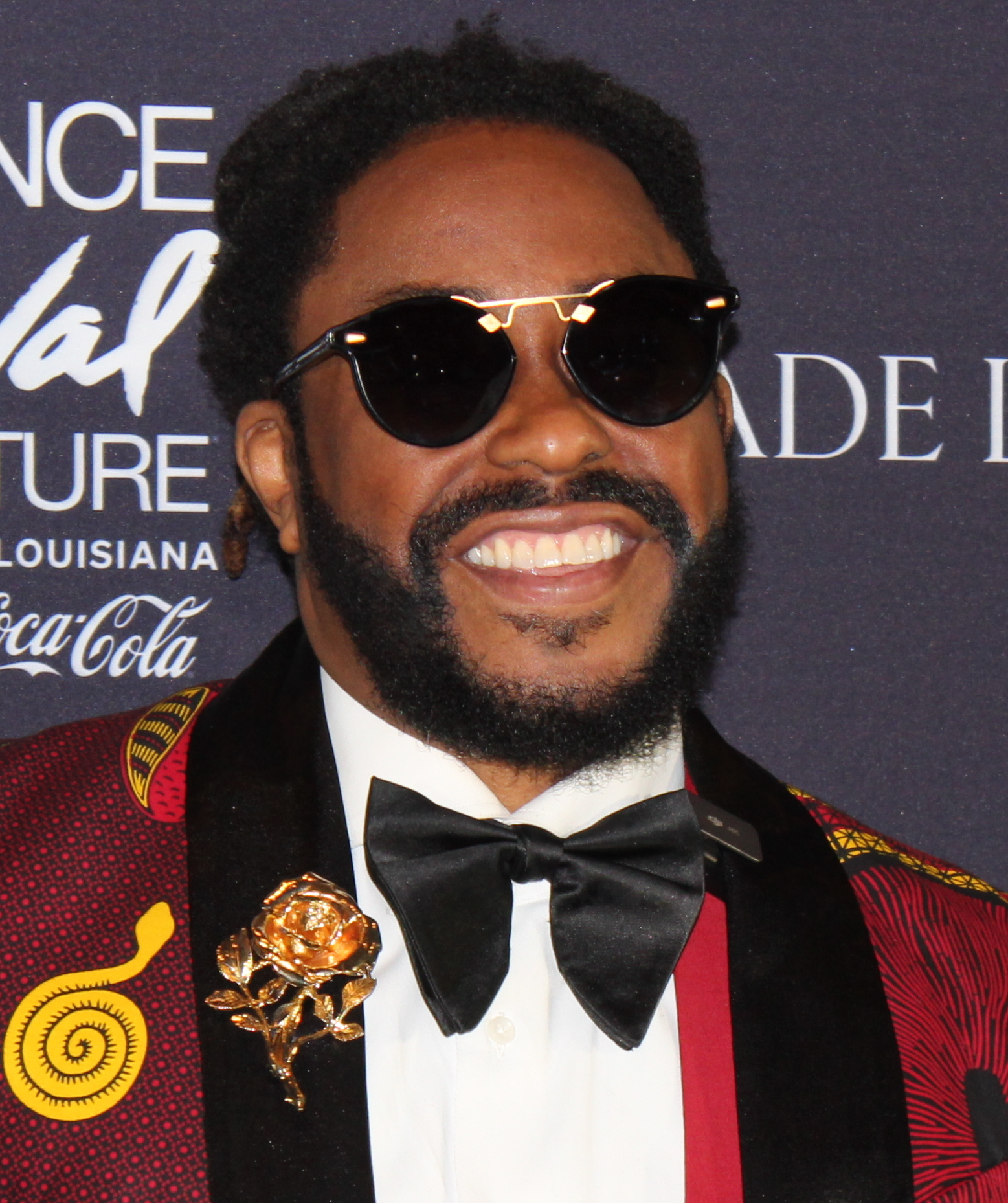
- DeVaughn in 2025

Background information
- Also known as: The Love King, Chronkite, Radio Raheem
- Born: Raheem DeVaughn; May 5, 1975 (age 51); Newark, New Jersey, U.S.
- Origin: Washington, D.C., U.S.
- Genres: R&B, neo soul
- Occupation: Singer-songwriter
- Instrument: Vocals
- Years active: 2002–present
- Labels: SoNo; DeVaughn Enterprises; E1; Fontana; Mass Appeal; Zomba; Jive
- Website: raheemdevaughnonline.global

Raheem DeVaughn (born May 5, 1975) is an American singer-songwriter. He signed with Jive Records to release his debut album, The Love Experience (2005), which entered the Billboard 200, while his second album, Love Behind the Melody (2008), peaked at number five on the chart and yielded critical acclaim. The latter's first two singles, "Woman" and "Customer", both entered the Billboard Hot 100; the former was nominated for Best Male R&B Vocal Performance at the 50th Annual Grammy Awards. His third album, The Love & War MasterPeace (2010), saw continued praise and peaked within the Billboard 200's top ten, serving as his final release with Jive.

Subsequent albums—A Place Called Love Land (2013), Love Sex Passion (2015), Decade of a Love King (2018), The Love Reunion (2019), What a Time to Be In Love (2020), The Summer of Love and Fall in Love (both 2023), and Winter In Love (2025)—have all been released independently.

== Early life ==
DeVaughn was born in Newark, New Jersey on May 5, 1975, the son of jazz cellist Abdul Wadud. He was raised in Washington, D.C., and Maryland (Montgomery and Prince George's counties) by his mother, Imani Smith, a now retired federal worker. He is a cousin of singer Chrisette Michele. His mother states that her son first expressed an affinity towards music in preschool, recalling how whenever the class had musical events, he would conduct them. DeVaughn's love for music solidified during his early teens, when he began to envision his career path. One of his favorite artists was Babyface, and Smith recalls that her son once begged her to visit the Waxie Maxie's record store in the District to buy a promotional picture of the singer. DeVaughn visited his father during the summer, mainly in New Jersey. With his father, DeVaughn attended gigs and experienced his first taste of the life of a working musician.

He graduated from High Point High School in Beltsville, Maryland, an unincorporated section of Prince George's County. DeVaughn had an epiphany early in his college career at Coppin State University in Baltimore, when he saw a group of street corner singers and began harmonizing with them. DeVaughn said his focus became music: "Before I knew what was going on, I was... cutting class to write lyrics and record". His focus turned to becoming a professional singer.

== Career ==
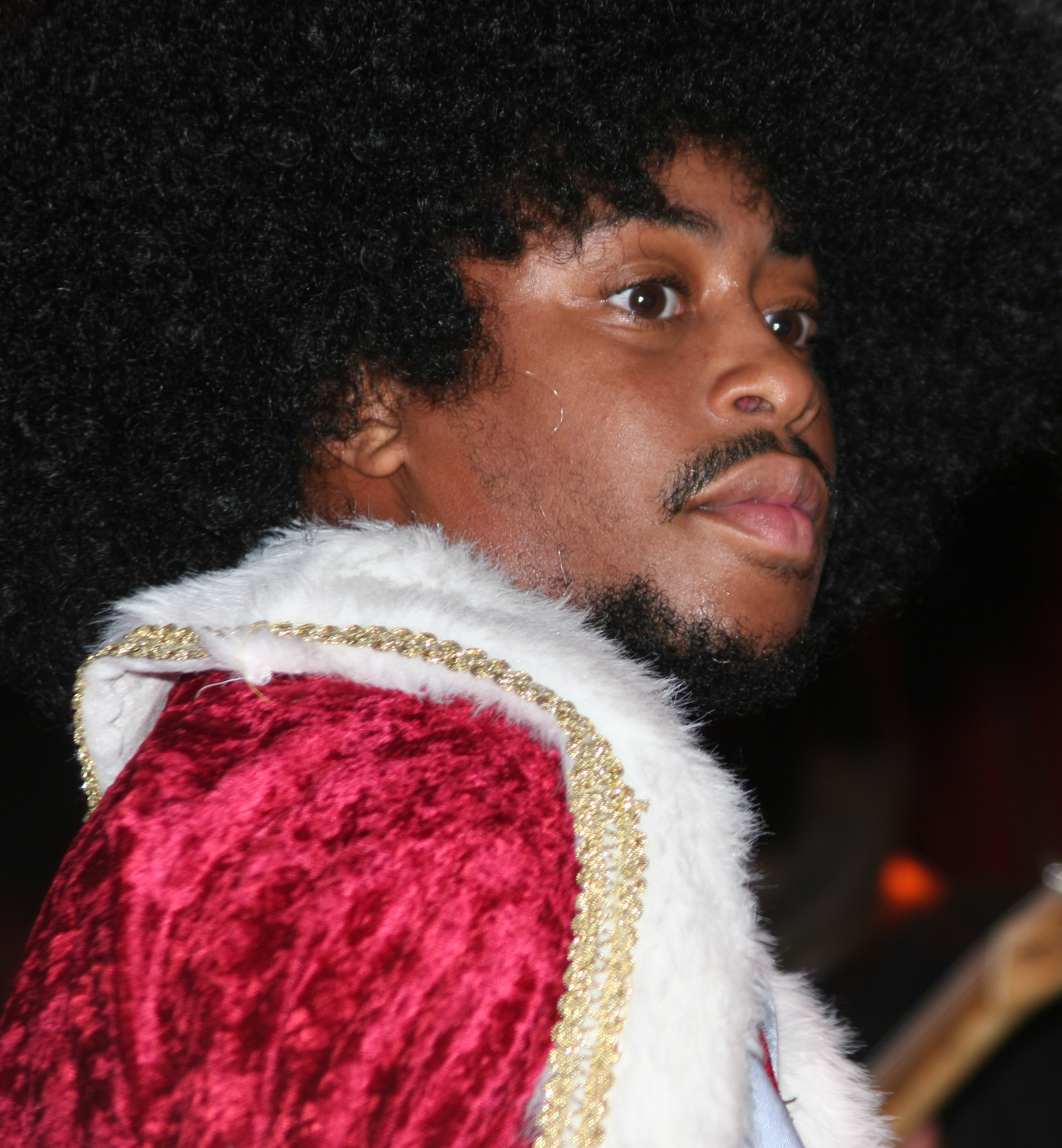
DeVaughn in 2005

DeVaughn took a job at Tower Records, where he put price tags on CDs. During that time he also began working the D.C. music circuit—performing with various groups, the most prominent of which being Urbanave31, and at venues such as the State of the Union and Bar Nun on U Street NW, all while having CDs of his songs ready at hand. Locally in the DC Metro area he attained relatively quick success, winning local awards and successfully releasing some independent work over the next few years. He won $2,000 from the Washington DC nightclub Bar Nun talent show. CEO Cliff Jones (Soul World Entertainment) and partner Jerry Vines, now the singer's longtime manager, met DeVaughn while managing the Baltimore-based quartet Dru Hill, and asked him to write a song for the group. DeVaughn ultimately gained the attention of record producers DJ Jazzy Jeff (as Rahiem) and Kenny Burns (known as former A&R for Roc-A-Fella Records) and with the help of Jones and Vines they signed a recording contract with Jive Records in 2002.

DeVaughn's first solo single released on a major label was the song entitled "Guess Who Loves You More", his second single was "You". DeVaughn's first Jive Records release The Love Experience, was acclaimed, selling around 250,000 units. While promoting the album, DeVaughn took to wearing a crown and cape at shows, a ploy to make himself stand out, calling himself the "Underground King." Around this time, DeVaughn also began making appearances at different shows in D.C. with artists such as W. Ellington Felton and Asheru of Unspoken Heard, hiding his face behind a hooded sweatshirt performing under the alias Chronkite. Felton comments that that alter ego was engendered for complicated reasons: "Chronkite represents that part of every artist who started what they're doing singing in front of a mirror as a child with a brush in their hand. At that time, it was based love, the initial attraction that draws you to music. In his business, unfortunately, your passion, your love, your individuality as an artist, can be stripped away the further you get into it."

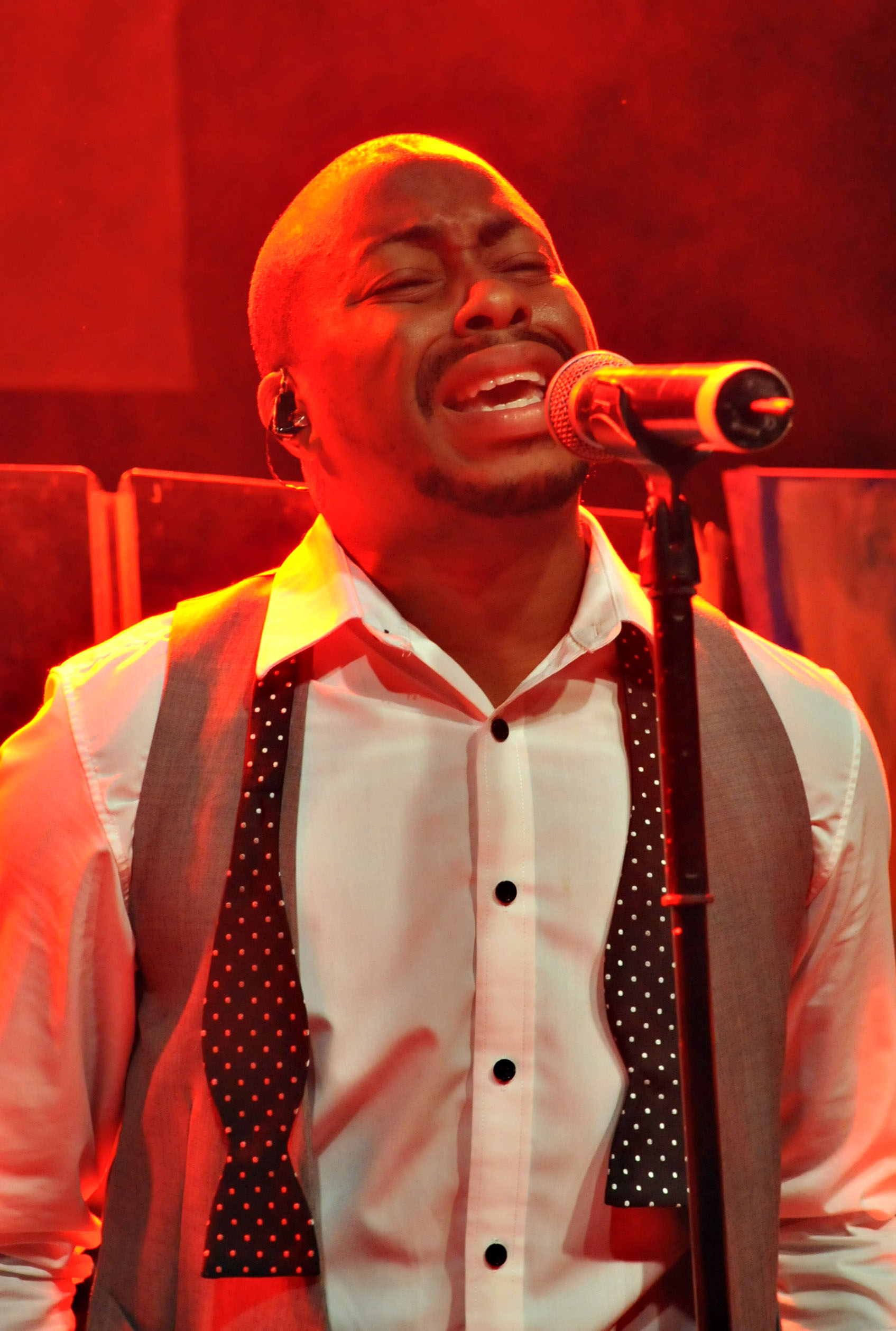
DeVaughn in 2010

DeVaughn has been compared to Dwele, Van Hunt, D'Angelo, Marvin Gaye, Donny Hathaway and Stevie Wonder. DeVaughn has described himself as a "R&B hippie neo-soul rock star," a take on the difficulty media types have classifying him. Although Jive has been thrown considerable weight behind his recent album, DeVaughn doesn't leave promotion duties entirely to his label: "I'm my best marketing tool. I'm building the brand Raheem DeVaughn. I have to do it." He worked on the street to spread the word around, sold mixtapes of unreleased material to build hype, and provided impromptu shows at local venues. In another act of self-promotion, DeVaughn made an appearance on The Tonight Show with Jay Leno in late January, wearing a shirt that read "Grammy Nominated on the front" and "Love Behind the Melody-- In Stores Now" on the back. He also appeared on the late-night talk show Jimmy Kimmel Live!, performing "Woman" on January 18, 2008.

His song "Woman" was featured as iTune's single of the week the week of January 27, 2008 and received a nomination for Best Male R&B Vocal Performance for the 2008 Grammy Awards.

In 2008, he was featured on T-Pain's song, "Reality Show" from the album Thr33 Ringz. The song also featured Jay Lyriq and Musiq Soulchild.

His song "You" was featured in the 2008 video game Grand Theft Auto IV.

DeVaughn was nominated for "Best R&B Album" in the 2011 Grammy Awards.

In September 2013, DeVaughn released his fourth studio album A Place Called Love Land on new label Mass Appeal Entertainment. The first single released from the album was "Love Connection".

On March 3, 2014, DeVaughn released a mixtape for free download titled King of Loveland.

== Awards and nominations ==
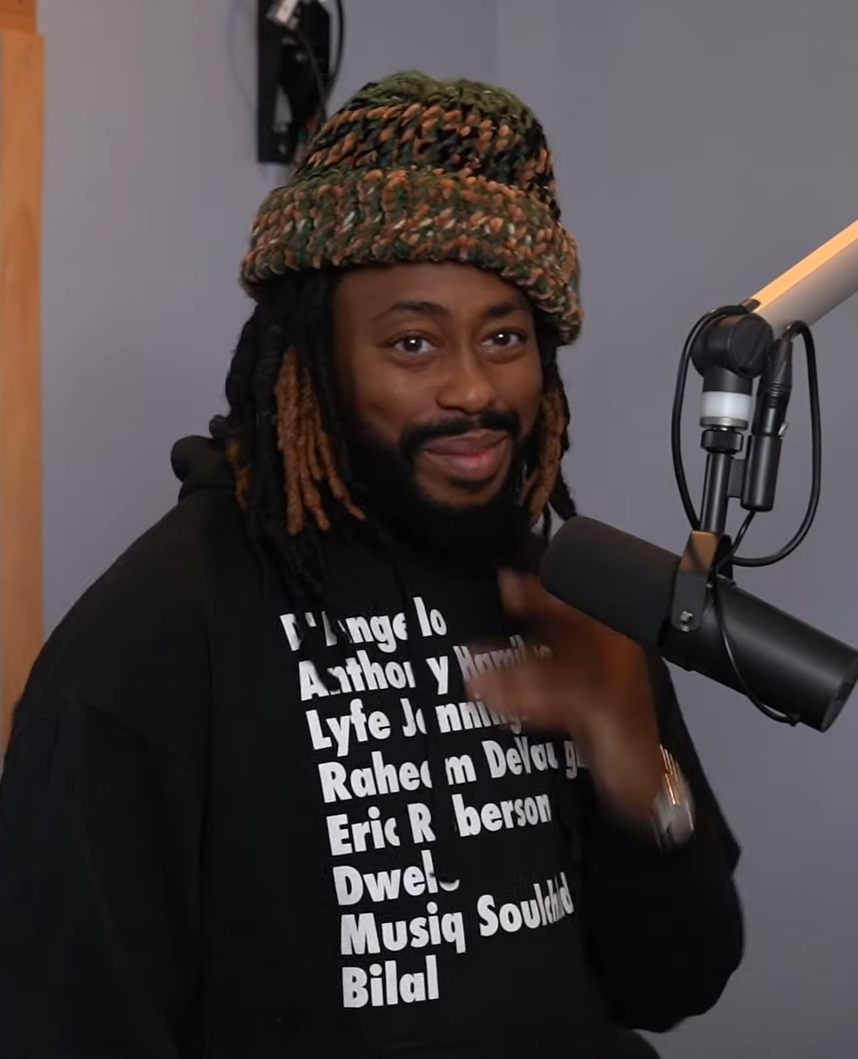
DeVaughn in 2024

- BET Awards
  - 2008, Best Male R&B Artist (Nominated)
  - 2008, BETJ Award (Won)
  - 2010, Best Male R&B Artist (Nominated)
- BET J Virtual Awards
  - 2008, Album of the Year: Love Behind the Melody (Won)
  - 2008, Song of the Year: "Woman" (won)
  - 2008, Live Performer of the Year (Nominated)
  - 2008, Male Artist of the Year (Won)
- Grammy Awards
  - 2008, Best Male R&B Vocal Performance "Woman" (Nominated)
  - 2009, Best R&B Song: "Customer" (Nominated)
  - 2011, Best R&B Album "The Love & War Masterpeace" (Nominated)

== Discography ==
"Back to Your Heart"
"Back to Your Heart" was released on Raheem Devaughn’s Art of Noise mixtape in June 2009.

Studio albums

- The Love Experience (2005)
- Love Behind the Melody (2008)
- The Love & War MasterPeace (2010)
- A Place Called Love Land (2013)
- Love Sex Passion (2015)
- Decade of a Love King (2018)
- The Love Reunion (2019)
- What a Time to Be in Love (2020)
- The Summer of Love (2023)
- Fall in Love (2023)
- Winter In Love (2025)
- Quiet Storm Lover Tome Un (2026)

Collaboration albums

- Lovesick (with Apollo Brown) (2021)
- Back 2 Love (with Bee Boy$oul) (2022)
