= Misia Hoshizora no Live Song Book: History of Hoshizora Live =

Live album by Misia
- Released: March 9, 2016
- Genre: R&B; soul; pop
- Length: 2:30:08
- Label: Ariola Japan
- Producer: Hiroto Tanigawa (exec.)

Misia chronology
Love Bebop (2016)	Misia Hoshizora no Live Song Book: History of Hoshizora Live (2016)	Misia Soul Jazz Session (2017)

Misia Hoshizora no Live Song Book: History of Hoshizora Live (MISIA 星空(ほしぞら)のライヴ SONG BOOK HISTORY OF HOSHIZORA LIVE) is the second live album by Japanese singer Misia. It compiles live material, spread out over two discs, collected from the Hoshizora Live concert series, recorded from its first installment in 2001 to the most recent in 2015, in commemoration of the series' 15th anniversary. The double album was released on March 9, 2016, through Ariola Japan.

== Background and release ==
The album consists of twenty-four of the best takes selected from Misia's Hoshizora Live concert series, which spans fifteen years and eight tours. The compilation includes live recordings, some previously released and others not, of "Tsutsumikomu Yō ni...", "Hi no Ataru Basho", "Believe", "Aitakute Ima", "Shiawase o Forever", and from her latest studio album "Shiroi Kisetsu", "Nagareboshi", and "Anata ni Smile :)", among others.

The album was released in standard edition and limited edition, the latter being packaged in digipak format and featuring different cover art. The artwork for the album's standard and limited editions, which depicts a cluster of rabbits looking up to the moon, a nod to the moon rabbit folklore that inspired the most recent Hoshizora no Live tour subtitle, was designed by Paris-based Japanese designer Shinsuke Kawahara.

== Commercial performance ==
Misia Hoshizora no Live Song Book: History of Hoshizora Live entered the daily Oricon Albums Chart at number 7, where it also peaked. The album debuted at number 10 on the weekly Oricon Albums Chart, selling 5,000 copies. It also debuted on the Billboard Japan Hot Albums chart, at number 24, and on the Top Albums Sales chart, at number 11. Misia Hoshizora no Live Song Book: History of Hoshizora Live charted for four consecutive weeks on the Oricon Albums Chart, selling a reported total of 7,000 copies during its run.

== Track listing ==
Disc 1
No.	Title	Writer(s)	Recording date and venue	Length
1.	"Anata ni Smile :)"	Misia; Ki-Yo	August 26, 2015, Festival Hall	7:22
2.	"Mayonaka no Hide-and-seek" (真夜中のHIDE-AND-SEEK, "Midnight Hide-and-seek")	Misia; Shirō Sagisu	August 16, 2015, Festival Hall	5:53
3.	"Shiroi Kisetsu"	her0ism; Yuuki Idei	August 15, 2015, Festival Hall	5:48
4.	"Color of Life" / "Re-Brain"	Misia; Joi; Kazuhiko Gomi; Francis Jocky	July 8, 2015, Tokyo International Forum	6:55
5.	"Sakura Hitohira"	Misia; her0ism; Shirose	July 8, 2015, Tokyo International Forum	4:29
6.	"Nagareboshi"	Rica	July 7, 2015, Tokyo International Forum	5:20
7.	"Boku wa Pegasus Kimi wa Polaris"	Misia; Hiroaki Yokoyama	April 2, 2014, Bunkamura Orchard Hall	5:01
8.	"Ashita e"	Misia; Toshiaki Matsumoto	April 2, 2014, Bunkamura Orchard Hall	5:20
9.	"Shiawase o Forever"	Misia; Matsumoto	February 16, 2014, Yokohama Arena	5:28
10.	"Deepness"	Misia; Jun Sasaki	January 18, 2014, Nippon Budokan	5:31
11.	"Koi wa Owaranai Zutto"	Misia; Sasaki	January 18, 2014, Nippon Budokan	5:16
12.	"The Glory Day"	Misia; Mash; Sagisu	January 18, 2014, Nippon Budokan	11:35
Total length:				1:14:06

Disc 2
No.	Title	Writer(s)	Recording date and venue	Length
1.	"Hi no Ataru Basho" / "Key of Love (Ai no Yukue)" (陽のあたる場所～KEY OF LOVE ～愛の行方～, "Key of Love (Love's Whereabouts)")	Misia; Sasaki	July 31, 2010, Maishima Outdoor Stage	6:57
2.	"Chiheisen no Mukōgawa e" (地平線の向こう側へ, "Beyond the Horizon")	Misia; Sinkiroh	February 14, 2010, Yokohama Arena	8:12
3.	"Aitakute Ima"	Misia; Sasaki	February 14, 2010, Yokohama Arena	6:13
4.	"Soba ni ite..." (そばにいて…, "Stay by My Side")	Misia; Sinkiroh	September 15, 2007, Mount Inasa Park Outdoor Stage	5:24
5.	"Tsuki" (月, "Moon")	Kazufumi Miyazawa; Sinkiroh	September 15, 2007, Mount Inasa Park Outdoor Stage	5:58
6.	"Tsutsumikomu Yō ni..."	Satoshi Shimano	August 27, 2006, Yamanakako Theater Hibiki	6:15
7.	"Everything"	Misia; Matsumoto	August 27, 2006, Yamanakako Theater Hibiki	7:01
8.	"Nemurenu Yoru wa Kimi no Sei"	Misia; Ken Matsubara	August 15, 2003, Ginowan Seaside Park Outdoor Stage	5:50
9.	"Ano Natsu no Mama de" (あの夏のままで, "Just Like That Summer")	Misia; Hidetoshi Yamada	August 2, 2007, Mount Inasa Park Special Outdoor Stage	6:07
10.	"Escape"	Misia; Sakoshin	July 19, 2003, Festival Hall	6:06
11.	"Nocturne"	Misia; Sagisu	October 7, 2001, Kawaguchiko Stellar Theater	6:18
12.	"Believe"	Misia; Mash; Sasaki	October 7, 2001, Kawaguchiko Stellar Theater	5:36
Total length:				1:16:02

== Charts ==
Chart (2016)	Peak position
Japan Daily Albums (Oricon)	7
Japan Weekly Albums (Oricon)	10
Japan Hot Albums (Billboard)	24
Japan Top Albums Sales (Billboard)	11

== Sales ==
Region	Certification	Certified units/sales
Japan	—	7,000
