= The Tour of Misia Love Bebop: All Roads Lead to You =

2016–17 concert tour by Misia

- Tour by Misia
- Associated album: Love Bebop
- Start date: December 2, 2016
- End date: February 5, 2017
- Legs: 2
- No. of shows: 17 in Asia

Misia concert chronology
- Misia Candle Night 2016 (2016); The Tour of Misia Love Bebop: All Roads Lead to You (2016–17); Misia Candle Night 2017 (2017)

The Tour of Misia Love Bebop: All Roads Lead to You was a concert tour by Japanese singer Misia, in support of her twelfth studio album Love Bebop (2016). The tour started on December 2, 2016 at Sendai Sun Plaza in Sendai, Miyagi and concluded on February 5, 2017 at Yokohama Arena in Yokohama, Kanagawa, comprising 17 dates. It is the twelfth and final installment of The Tour of Misia concert series, which began in 1999 and ran for 18 years. The final show of the tour was released as a video album on May 24, 2017.

== Background ==
On June 20, 2016, Misia announced through her official website that she would embark on a new installment of The Tour of Misia concert series, the first in four years, since The Tour of Misia Japan Soul Quest. She announced thirteen hall dates and four arena dates. On August 19, 2016, it was announced Misia would be holding auditions for backup dancers to join her on tour. Ticket sales opened to the general public on October 1, 2016 for the hall shows and on December 1, 2016 for the arena shows. On November 15, 2016, Misia announced she had partnered with au to offer a limited number of tickets to their au smartpass subscribers. On January 20, 2017, she announced that the final date of the tour would be broadcast on Wowow on March 26, 2017. The network also aired a special program in anticipation of the concert, featuring an interview with Misia and footage of the tour on March 4, 2017.

== Set list ==
This set list is representative of the concert on January 29, 2017. It does not represent all concerts for the duration of the tour.

1. "Love Bebop"
2. "Butterfly Butterfly"
3. "Escape 2016"
4. "Back Blocks"
5. "Rhythm Reflection"
6. "Change for Good"
7. "Catch the Rainbow"
8. "Ashita wa Motto Suki ni Naru" (明日はもっと好きになる, "Love You More Tomorrow")
9. "Mayonaka no Hide-and-seek" (真夜中のHIDE-AND-SEEK, "Midnight Hide-and-seek")
10. "Shiroi Kisetsu" (Piano version)
11. "Nagareboshi" (Piano version)
12. "Sakura Hitohira"
13. "Orphans no Namida"
14. "Freedom"
15. "Super Rainbow"
16. "Oh Lovely Day"

Encore

17. "Into the Light" (David Sussman's Mix)
18. "Sweetness" (Satoshi Tomiie Remix)
19. "Aitakute Ima" (Gomi Remix)
20. "Candle of Life" (Make a Wish Remix)
21. "Wasurenai Hibi" (Hex Hector's Club Mix)
22. "The Glory Day" (Gomi Remix)
23. "Everything" (Junior + Gomi Club Extended Mix)
24. "Anata ni Smile :)"
25. "Hana" (花, "Flower")
Notes
- "Ashita wa Motto Suki ni Naru" and "Mayonaka no Hide-and-seek" were not performed during the December 2 and 17, 2016 shows. During the December 18, 23, 24, 2016 and January 14, 2017 shows, only the latter track was performed. During the December 2-3, 2016 and January 7, 2017 shows, the performance order of the songs were switched.
- During the acoustic portion of the show, Misia performed on the piano "Nagareboshi" at every show of the tour. In addition to "Nagareboshi", she performed:
  - "Snow Song" at every show prior to the January 8, 2017 concert;
  - "Kiss Shite Dakishimete" during the December 2, 10, 18, 2016 and January 14, 20, 2017 and February 4, 2017 dates;
  - "Shiroi Kisetsu" from the January 8, 2017 show onwards;
  - "It's Just Love" at the December 3, 17, 2016 and February 5, 2017 dates; and
  - "Holy Hold Me" during the December 23-24, 2016 shows.
- During the December 3, 10, 23-24, 2016 and January 8, 21, 2017 and February 4-5, 2017 dates, Misia included "Tsutsumikomu Yō ni..." to the set list.
- "Sakura Hitohira" was performed at every show from January 14 through January 29, 2017.

== Shows ==
List of concerts, showing date, city, country, venue, and opening acts.
Date	City	Country	Venue	Opening acts
Hall dates
December 2, 2016	Sendai	Japan	Sendai Sun Plaza	Little Black Dress
December 3, 2016	Sendai	Japan	Sendai Sun Plaza	Little Black Dress
December 10, 2016	Kanazawa	Japan	Honda no Mori Hall	Little Black Dress
December 17, 2016	Nagoya	Japan	Nagoya Congress Center Century Hall	Little Black Dress
December 18, 2016	Nagoya	Japan	Nagoya Congress Center Century Hall	Little Black Dress
December 23, 2016	Fukuoka	Japan	Fukuoka Sunpalace	Little Black Dress
December 24, 2016	Kitakyushu	Japan	Harmonie Cinq Kitakyushu Soleil Hall	Little Black Dress
January 7, 2017	Sapporo	Japan	Nitori Culture Hall	Little Black Dress
January 8, 2017	Sapporo	Japan	Nitori Culture Hall	Little Black Dress
January 13, 2017	Kurashiki	Japan	Kurashiki City Auditorium	Little Black Dress
January 14, 2017	Hiroshima	Japan	Hiroshima Bunka Gakuen HBG Hall	Little Black Dress
January 20, 2017	Kōchi	Japan	Kochi Prefectural Culture Hall Orange Hall	Little Black Dress
January 21, 2017	Takamatsu	Japan	Sunport Hall Takamatsu	Little Black Dress
Arena dates
January 28, 2017	Osaka	Japan	Osaka-jō Hall	Little Black Dress
January 29, 2017	Osaka	Japan	Osaka-jō Hall	Little Black Dress
February 4, 2017	Yokohama	Japan	Yokohama Arena	Little Black Dress
February 5, 2017	Yokohama	Japan	Yokohama Arena	Little Black Dress

== Personnel ==
Band (Arena dates)

- Misia – lead vocals
- Tohru Shigemi – keyboard
- Shūhei Yamaguchi – guitar
- Jino – bass
- Tomo Kanno – drums
- Ta-Shi - DJ
- Hanah Spring - backing vocals
- Lyn – backing vocals
- Tiger - backing vocals
- Gen Ittetsu, Mori Takuya, Maki Cameroun, Kirin Uchida - strings

Band (Hall dates)

- Misia – lead vocals
- Tohru Shigemi – keyboard
- Shūhei Yamaguchi – guitar
- Jino – bass
- Tomo Kanno – drums
- Ta-Shi - DJ
- Lyn – backing vocals

Drag queens (Arena dates)

- Margarette
- Hossy
- Rachel D'Amour
- Mondo
- Lil'Grand-Bitch
- Dita Starmine
- Oz
- Miss Maria
- Iriza Lotion

Dancers (All dates)

- Calin Matsuo
- Kana Nakano
- Haruna Nakayama
- Haruna Sakamoto
- Kyo-ka Shimojo
- Miyu Suzuki
