= Misia Hoshizora no Live IX: Premium Live =

2016 concert tour by Misia

- Tour by Misia
- Start date: May 3, 2016
- End date: July 15, 2016
- Legs: 2
- No. of shows: 8 in Asia

Misia concert chronology
- Misia Candle Night 2015 (2015); Misia Hoshizora no Live IX: Premium Live (2016); Misia Candle Night 2016 (2016)

Misia Hoshizora no Live IX: Premium Live (MISIA 星空のライヴIX PREMIUM LIVE) was a concert tour by Japanese singer Misia and the ninth installment of the Hoshizora Live concert series. The tour began on May 3, 2016 at Kawaguchiko Stellar Theater in Fujikawaguchiko, Yamanashi and concluded on July 15, 2016 at Orix Theater in Osaka, Osaka, comprising two legs and a total of eight shows.

== Background ==
On December 10, 2015, Misia announced the first dates of the tour. The first three shows, which constitute the first leg of the tour, would take place at Kawaguchiko Stellar Theater on consecutive days starting May 3, 2016. The shows were held to commemorate the 20th anniversary of Rhythmedia, the production and management company representing Misia. Ticket sales opened to the general public on February 27, 2016. The first pressing of the live compilation album Misia Hoshizora no Live Song Book: History of Hoshizora Live included a pre-sale access code which allowed fans to participate in a raffle to win tickets to the shows.

The second round of tour dates was announced on March 1, 2016, for which tickets went on sale May 28, 2016. Band members for the tour were announced on April 25, 2016. The following day, DJ Emma, Muro and DJ Nori were announced as special guests for the opening ceremony of each date, respectively.

== Set list ==
The first three dates of the tour featured totally different set lists for each show. Misia sang a total of 49 songs during the first leg of the tour. The second leg of the tour featured four different acts.

=== First leg ===
This set list is representative of the concert on May 3, 2016. It does not represent all concerts for the duration of the tour.

1. "Believe"
2. "Sunny Day"
3. "Back Blocks"
4. "La La La"
5. "Ame no Nichiyōbi" (雨の日曜日, "Rainy Sunday")
6. "Hoshi no Yō ni..."
7. "Tsuki" (月, "Moon")
8. "Wasurenai Hibi"
9. "The Best of Time"
10. "Ano Natsu no Mama de" (あの夏のままで, "Like That Summer")
11. "Shiawase o Forever"
12. "The Glory Day"

Encore

13. "Oh Lovely Day"
14. "Anata ni Smile :)"

Double Encore

15. "Hoshi no Furu Oka" (星の降る丘, "Starry Hill")
May 4, 2016 set list
1. "Hi no Ataru Basho / Key of Love (Ai no Yukue)"
2. "Mayonaka no Hide-and-seek"
3. "Remember Lady"
4. "Mekubase no Blues" (めくばせのブルース, "The Winking Blues")
5. "Escape"
6. "Chiheisen no Mukōgawa e" (地平線の向こう側へ, "Beyond the Horizon")
7. "Boku no Kimochi" (僕のきもち, "What I Feel")
8. "Shiroi Kisetsu"
9. "Aitakute Ima"
10. "Deepness"
11. "Hoshi no Ginka"
12. "Luv Parade" (Soul Mix version)
13. "The Glory Day"

Encore

14. "Oh Lovely Day"
15. "Anata ni Smile :)"
16. "Nagareboshi"
May 5, 2016 set list
1. "Maware Maware"
2. "Color of Life / Re-Brain"
3. "Nocturne"
4. "Chandelier"
5. "Atsui Namida" (アツイナミダ, "Warm Tears")
6. "Nemurenu Yoru wa Kimi no Sei"
7. "Soba ni Ite..." (そばにいて..., "Stay by My Side...")
8. "It's Just Love"
9. "Everything"
10. "Orphans no Namida"
11. "Shining Star"
12. "We Are the Music"
13. "The Glory Day"

Encore

14. "Oh Lovely Day"
15. "Anata ni Smile :)"
16. "Tsutsumikomu Yō ni..."

Double Encore

17. "Hoshi no Furu Oka"

=== Second leg ===
This set list is representative of the concert on July 7, 2016. It does not represent all concerts for the duration of the tour.

1. "Believe"
2. "Hi no Ataru Basho" / "Key of Love (Ai no Yukue)" (KEY OF LOVE ～愛の行方～, "Key of Love (Love's Whereabouts")
3. "Color of Life" / "Re-Brain"
4. "Tsutsumikomu Yō ni..."
5. "Mayonaka no Hide-and-seek" (真夜中のHIDE-AND-SEEK, "Midnight Hide-and-seek")
6. "The Best of Time"
7. "Nemurenu Yoru wa Kimi no Sei"
8. "Orphans no Namida"
9. "Ashita e"
10. "Hoshi no Ginka" (星の銀貨, "Silver Star Coin")
11. "Holiday" / "We Are the Music"
12. "Shiawase o Forever"
13. "The Glory Day"

Encore

14. Oh Lovely Day"
15. "Anata ni Smile :)"
16. "Super Rainbow"
Notes
- During the July 6 and July 14 shows, "Back Blocks" was performed in place of "The Best of Time".
- During the July 6 and July 14 shows, "Ano Natsu no Mama de" was performed in place of "Nemurenu Yoru wa Kimi no Sei".
- During the July 6 and July 14 shows, "Ashita e" was omitted from the set list.
- During the July 6 show, "Hope & Dreams" replaced "Holiday" in the medley with "We Are the Music".
- During the July 12 show, "Nagareboshi" was sung in place of "Nemurenu Yoru wa Kimi no Sei".
- During the July 14 show, "Ano Natsu no Mama de" and "Nagareboshi" were both sung in place "Nemurenu Yoru wa Kimi no Sei".
- During the July 15 show, "Super Rainbow" was moved up and performed in place of "Holiday".
- During the July 15 show, "Hoshi no Furu Oka" was added and performed as the last song of the set.

== Shows ==
List of concerts, showing date, city, country, venue, and opening acts.
Date	City	Country	Venue	Opening acts
Leg 1—Asia
May 3, 2016	Fujikawaguchiko	Japan	Kawaguchiko Stellar Theater	DJ Emma
May 4, 2016	Fujikawaguchiko	Japan	Kawaguchiko Stellar Theater	Muro
May 5, 2016	Fujikawaguchiko	Japan	Kawaguchiko Stellar Theater	DJ Nori
Leg 2—Asia
July 6, 2016	Tokyo	Japan	NHK Hall	—N/a
July 7, 2017	Tokyo	Japan	NHK Hall	—N/a
July 12, 2017	Nagoya	Japan	NTK Hall Forest Hall	—N/a
July 14, 2017	Osaka	Japan	Orix Theater	—N/a
July 15, 2017	Osaka	Japan	Orix Theater	—N/a

== Personnel ==
Band

- Misia – lead vocals
- Tohru Shigemi – keyboard
- Shūhei Yamaguchi – guitar
- Satoshi Yoshida - guitar
- Jino – bass
- Tomo Kanno – drums
- Akio Suzuki - sax, flute
- Kumi Sasaki – backing vocals, organ
- Tiger - backing vocals
- Hanah Spring - backing vocals
- Lyn - backing vocals
- Gen Ittetsu, Daisuke Kadowaki, Maki Cameroun, Mori Takuya, Toshiyuki Muranaka, Yayoi Fujita - strings
