= Misia Candle Night 2015 =

2015 concert tour by Misia

- Tour by Misia
- Start date: September 21, 2015
- End date: October 11, 2015
- Legs: 2
- No. of shows: 4 in Asia

Misia concert chronology
- Misia Hoshizora no Live VIII: Moon Journey (2015); Misia Candle Night 2015 (2015); Misia Hoshizora no Live IX: Premium Live (2016)

Misia Candle Night 2015 was a concert tour by Japanese singer Misia and the fourth installment of the Misia Candle Night concert series. The tour started with two back-to-back dates at Kawaguchiko Stellar Theater in Fujikawaguchiko, Yamanashi on September 21-22, 2015, and concluded with two consecutive dates at the World Heritage Site Mount Kōya in Kōya, Wakayama, held as part of the World Heritage Theater project to celebrate the temple's 1200th anniversary, on October 10-11, 2015.

== Background ==
On June 30, 2015, Misia announced she would be hosting a four-date installment of the Misia Candle Night concert series starting in September 2015. On September 18, 2015, it was announced that all pre-sale tickets for the first two shows had sold out. The charity Candle Night Bar stand at the concert venue raised a total of 301,059 yen for both Kawaguchiko Stellar Theater shows combined. Proceeds after expenses benefited the non-profit Mudef.

== Set list ==
This set list is representative of the concert on September 21, 2015. It does not represent all concerts for the duration of the tour.

1. "Anata ni Smile :)"
2. "Mayonaka no Hide-and-seek" (真夜中のHIDE-AND-SEEK, "Midnight Hide-and-seek")
3. "Chandelier"
4. "Nocturne" (Strings Off)
5. "Koi Gram" (恋グラム, "Love Gram")
6. "Sukoshi Zutsu Taisetsu ni"
7. "Shiroi Kisetsu" (Piano & Strings version)
8. "Hana" (花, "Flower") (Strings Off)
9. "Jewelry"
10. "Orphans no Namida"
11. "Deepness"
12. "Kokoro Hitotsu"
13. "Nagareboshi"
14. "Candle of Life"

Encore

15. "Boku wa Pegasus Kimi wa Polaris"
16. "Ashita e"
Notes
- During the October 11, 2015 show, a short version of "Hi no Ataru Basho" was performed in place of "Chandelier".
- During the October 11, 2015 show, "Tsutsumikomu Yō ni..." was added to the set list while "Nocturne" was omitted.
- "Koi Gram" was swapped for "Hyakunen Ai" during the September 22, 2015 show, and for "Everything" on the October 10-11, 2015 shows.
- During the October 10-11, 2015 shows, "Sakura Hitohira" was sung in place of "Jewelry".
- During the September 22, 2015 show, "Sakura Hitohira" was sung in place of "Kokoro Hitotsu", which was performed later as an encore.
- During the October 10-11, 2015 shows, "Kokoro Hitotsu" was replaced by "Aitakute Ima".
- "One Day, One Life" was added to the set list of the last three shows.
- During the September 22, 2015 show, Misia gave encore performances of the songs "Sukoshi Zutsu Taisetsu ni" and "Anata ni Smile :)", both performed earlier in the set.

== Shows ==
List of concerts, showing date, city, country, venue, and opening acts.
Date	City	Country	Venue	Opening acts
Leg 1—Asia
September 21, 2015	Fujikawaguchiko	Japan	Kawaguchiko Stellar Theater	Hanah Spring
September 22, 2015	Fujikawaguchiko	Japan	Kawaguchiko Stellar Theater	Hanah Spring
Leg 2—Asia
October 10, 2015	Kōya	Japan	Mount Kōya	Hanah Spring
October 11, 2015	Kōya	Japan	Mount Kōya	Hanah Spring

== Personnel ==
Band

- Misia – lead vocals
- Tohru Shigemi – keyboard
- Shūhei Yamaguchi – guitar
- Satoshi Yoshida - guitar
- Jino – bass
- Tomo Kanno – drums
- Akio Suzuki - sax, flute
- Hanah Spring - backing vocals
- Lyn - backing vocals
- Gen Ittetsu, Maki Cameroun, Mori Takuya, Masami Horisawa - strings
