= Misia Hoshizora no Live VIII: Moon Journey =

2015 concert tour by Misia

- Tour by Misia
- Start date: May 3, 2016
- End date: July 15, 2016
- Legs: 2
- No. of shows: 37 in Asia

Misia concert chronology
- Misia Candle Night 2014 (2014); Misia Hoshizora no Live VIII: Moon Journey (2015); Misia Candle Night 2015 (2015)

Misia Hoshizora no Live VIII: Moon Journey (MISIA 星空のライヴVIII MOON JOURNEY) was a concert tour by Japanese singer Misia and the eighth installment of the Hoshizora Live concert series. The tour began on April 11, 2015 at Aichi Prefectural Art Theater in Nagoya, Aichi and concluded on October 20, 2015 at Festival Hall in Osaka, Osaka, comprising 37 shows.

== Background ==
On December 22, 2014, Misia announced she would embark on the eighth Hoshizora Live tour with a list of 33 dates in 18 different cities. The tour subtitle Moon Journey was revealed on January 16, 2015. Ticket sales opened to the general public on March 8, 2015. With a purchase of both the double A-side CD single "Shiroi Kisetsu" / "Sakura Hitohira" and the video album Sekai Isan Gekijō Misia Candle Night at Okinawa, fans were offered a chance to win two backstage passes to one of Misia's shows. Two additional dates for July 2015 were announced on March 16, 2015. On June 17, 2015, it was announced that Michiko Shimizu would appear as a special guest at the two dates in Tokyo.

On July 24, 2015, Misia announced through her official website and social media the cancellation of the July 25, 2015 Sunport Hall Takamatsu show due to illness. On July 27, 2015, the cancelled date was rescheduled for October 17, 2015, at the same venue. Two additional dates, one at Naruto Bunka Kaikan in Naruto, Tokushima, and another at Festival Hall in Osaka, Osaka were announced.

== Set list ==
This set list is representative of the concert on July 7, 2015. It does not represent all concerts for the duration of the tour.

1. "Sakura Hitohira"
2. "Hi no Ataru Basho"
3. "Royal Chocolate Flush"
4. "Mekubase no Blues" (めくばせのブルース, "The Winking Blues")
5. "Ashita wa Motto Suki ni Naru" (明日はもっと好きになる, "Love You More Tomorrow")
6. "Mayonaka no Hide-and-seek" (真夜中のHIDE-AND-SEEK, "Midnight Hide-and-seek")
7. "Aitakute Ima" (Acoustic version)
8. "Everything"
9. "Hana" (花, "Flower")
10. "Shiroi Kisetsu"
11. "Koi no Boogie Oogie Train" (恋のブギ・ウギ・トレイン, "Boogie Oogie Love Train") (Ann Lewis cover)
12. "Luv Parade" (Soul Mix version)
13. "Color of Life"
14. "Re-Brain"
15. "Hope & Dreams"

Encore

16. "Anata ni Smile :)"
17. "Nagareboshi"
Notes
- "Koi no Boogie Oogie Train" was performed by backing singer Hanah Spring during Misia's costume change. It was performed alternately, or in addition, with an original song by Spring.
- The Soul Mix version of "Luv Parade" incorporates Stevie Wonder's "Sir Duke" and the Jackson 5's "I Want You Back" into a medley.
- "Royal Chocolate Flush" was performed at every show except for the second show in Ginowan.
- During the June 24 show in Fukuyama, and the August 29 show in Ginowan, "Ashita wa Motto Suki ni Naru" was replaced by "Tsutsumikomu Yō ni..." and "Anata ni Smile :)", respectively.
- "Any Love" was performed at 24 of the tour dates and replaced or omitted during the other dates.
- Beginning with the July 18 show, "Everything" was added to the first half of the set and performed at every following show, except the June 30 and July 23 shows.
- During the June 24 show in Fukuyama, "Hana" was omitted from the set list.
- During the June 26 show in Yonago, Misia performed "Tsutsumikomu Yō ni..." with Hanah Spring to celebrate her birthday.
- During the July 18 show in Ueda, Misia performed "Tsutsumikomu Yō ni..." with a guitar solo intro by Satoshi Yoshida to celebrate her first concert in the city.
- During the April 12, April 17, May 15, May 16 shows, "Aoi Tsukikage" was added to the first half of the set list.
- During the April 12 and May 15 shows, "Miss You Always" was added to the set list.
- During the April 11 and May 6 shows, "It's Just Love" was added to the later half of the set list.
- Beginning with the April 11 show in Nagoya and until the June 30 show in Osaka, "One Day, One Life" was performed as the first encore. From the July 1 show in Osaka and on, "Anata ni Smile :)" was sung in its place, except for the August 29 show in Ginowan where "One Day, One Life" made a comeback.
Special guests
- During the July 7–8 shows in Tokyo, Michiko Shimizu performed a mini set during the intermission preceding the first encore, consisting of musical impersonations of Yumi Matsutoya's "No Side", Akihiro Miwa's "Yoitomake no Uta" and Akiko Yano's "Hitotsu Dake".
- During the July 8 show, Misia and Shimizu performed "What a Wonderful World" together.

== Shows ==
List of concerts, showing date, city, country, and venue
Date	City	Country	Venue
Leg 1—Asia
April 11, 2015	Nagoya	Japan	Aichi Prefectural Art Theater
April 12, 2015	Nagoya	Japan	Aichi Prefectural Art Theater
April 17, 2015	Fukuoka	Japan	Fukuoka Sunpalace
April 18, 2015	Fukuoka	Japan	Fukuoka Sunpalace
April 24, 2015	Sapporo	Japan	Nitori Culture Hall
April 25, 2015	Sapporo	Japan	Nitori Culture Hall
May 5, 2015	Tokyo	Japan	Tokyo International Forum
May 6, 2015	Tokyo	Japan	Tokyo International Forum
May 8, 2015	Tokyo	Japan	Tokyo International Forum
May 15, 2015	Kurashiki	Japan	Kurashiki City Auditorium
May 16, 2015	Hiroshima	Japan	Hiroshima Bunka Gakuen HBG Hall
May 20, 2015	Hamamatsu	Japan	Act City Hamamatsu
June 5, 2015	Miyazaki	Japan	Miyazaki Municipal Culture Hall
June 7, 2015	Kagoshima	Japan	Kagoshima Citizens' Cultural Hall
June 11, 2015	Sendai	Japan	Sendai Sun Plaza
June 12, 2015	Sendai	Japan	Sendai Sun Plaza
June 17, 2015	Nagaoka	Japan	Nagaoka Municipal Auditorium
June 18, 2015	Niigata	Japan	Niigata Prefectural Civic Center
June 24, 2015	Fukuyama	Japan	Fukuyama Hall of Art and Culture; Reed & Rose
June 26, 2015	Yonago	Japan	Yonago Convention Center Big Ship
June 30, 2015	Osaka	Japan	Festival Hall
July 1, 2015	Osaka	Japan	Festival Hall
July 7, 2015	Tokyo	Japan	Tokyo International Forum
July 8, 2015	Tokyo	Japan	Tokyo International Forum
July 11, 2015	Osaka	Japan	Festival Hall
July 12, 2015	Osaka	Japan	Festival Hall
July 17, 2015	Kanazawa	Japan	Honda no Mori Hall
July 18, 2015	Ueda	Japan	Santomyuze
July 23, 2015	Kōchi	Japan	Kochi Prefectural Culture Hall; Orange Hall
August 13, 2015	Fukuoka	Japan	Fukuoka Sunpalace
August 15, 2015	Osaka	Japan	Festival Hall
August 16, 2015	Osaka	Japan	Festival Hall
August 29, 2015	Ginowan	Japan	Okinawa Convention Center
August 30, 2015	Ginowan	Japan	Okinawa Convention Center
Leg 2—Asia
October 17, 2015	Takamatsu	Japan	Sunport Hall Takamatsu
October 18, 2015	Naruto	Japan	Naruto Bunka Kaikan
October 20, 2015	Osaka	Japan	Festival Hall

== Cancelled shows ==
Date	City	Country	Venue	Reason
July 25, 2015	Takamatsu	Japan	Sunport Hall Takamatsu	Health problems

== Personnel ==
Band

- Misia – lead vocals
- Tohru Shigemi – keyboard
- Shūhei Yamaguchi – guitar
- Satoshi Yoshida - guitar
- Jino – bass
- Tomo Kanno – drums
- Hanah Spring - backing vocals
- Lyn - backing vocals
- Yuho - backing vocals
