= Misia Candle Night 2016 =

2016 concert tour by Misia

- Tour by Misia
- Start date: September 10, 2016
- End date: September 11, 2016
- Legs: 1
- No. of shows: 2 in Asia

Misia concert chronology
- Misia Hoshizora no Live IX: Premium Live (2016); Misia Candle Night 2016 (2016); The Tour of Misia Love Bebop: All Roads Lead to You (2016–17)

Misia Candle Night 2016 was a concert tour by Japanese singer Misia and the fifth installment of the Misia Candle Night concert series. The two-date tour was held in collaboration with the World Heritage Theater project on September 10-11, 2016 at Kasuga-taisha in Nara, Nara to commemorate the Shinto shrine and World Heritage Site's 60th anniversary and the first Shikinen Zōtai (式年造替) ritual in 20 years.

== Background ==
On June 6, 2016, Misia announced the two dates for the 2016 installment of the Misia Candle Night concert series. The concerts announced to be held on a special outdoor stage on the Tobihino (飛火野) hill of the Nara Park, where the Kasuga Shrine is located. On June 20, 2016, Michiko Shimizu was announced as a special guest for the two-date tour. Tickets went on sale to the general public on August 20, 2016. The charity Candle Night Bar, whose proceeds go toward the non-profit organization Mudef, raised funds of 441,401 yen for the two shows combined.

== Set list ==
This set list is representative of the concert on September 11, 2016. It does not represent all concerts for the duration of the tour.

1. "Super Rainbow"
2. "Mayonaka no Hide-and-seek" (真夜中のHIDE-AND-SEEK, "Midnight Hide-and-seek")
3. "Anata ni Smile :)"
4. "Satchan"
5. "Hyakunen no Koe no Uta" (100年の声の歌, "Hundred Years of Voices in a Song")
6. "Watashi no Folk Medley" (私のフォークメドレー, "My Folk Medley")
7. "Ame no Machi o" (雨の街を, "In a Rainy Town") (Yumi Arai cover)
8. "Boku ga Ichiban Hoshikatta Mono" (Noriyuki Makihara cover)
9. "Machi" (街, "Town") (Tsuyoshi Domoto cover)
10. "Let It Smile"
11. "Indigo Waltz" (Toshinobu Kubota cover)
12. "Aitakute Ima"
13. "Orphans no Namida"
14. "One Day, One Life"
15. "Life in Harmony"
16. "Hatenaku Tsuzuku Story"

Encore

17. "Hitotsu Dake" (ひとつだけ, "Only One") (Akiko Yano cover)
18. "Candle of Life"
Notes
- "Satchan", "Hyakunen no Koe no Uta" and "Watashi no Folk Medley" were performed by special guest Michiko Shimizu as part of her set.
- "Ame no Machi o" and "Hitotsu Dake" were performed together by Misia and Shimizu.
- During the September 10, 2016 show:
  - Misia sang "Toki o Tomete" in place of "Machi";
  - "Back in Love Again" was sung in place of "Aitakute Ima";
  - "Hatenaku Tsuzuku Story" was omitted from the set list.
- "Hitotsu Dake" and "Candle of Life" were performed as the encore to both shows.

== Shows ==
List of concerts, showing date, city, country, and venue.
Date	City	Country	Venue
September 10, 2016	Nara	Japan	Kasuga-taisha
September 11, 2016	Nara	Japan	Kasuga-taisha

== Personnel ==
Band

- Misia – lead vocals
- Tohru Shigemi – keyboard
- Shūhei Yamaguchi – guitar
- Jino – bass
- Tomo Kanno – drums
- Akio Suzuki - sax, flute
- Kumi Sasaki – backing vocals, organ
- Lyn - backing vocals
