= Love Bebop =

Studio album by Misia
- Released: January 6, 2016
- Recorded: March 2014 – October 2015
- Genre: Pop; dance; R&B; soul
- Length: 57:33
- Label: Ariola Japan
- Producer: DJ Gomi; Takayuki Hattori; her0ism; Hiroshi Matsui; Shirō Sagisu; Sakoshin; Tohru Shigemi; Hiroto Tanigawa (exec.)

Misia chronology
New Morning (2014)	Love Bebop (2016)	Misia Hoshizora no Live Song Book: History of Hoshizora Live (2016)

Singles from Love Bebop
- 1. "Shiroi Kisetsu" Released: February 18, 2015; 2. "Sakura Hitohira" Released: February 18, 2015; 3. "Nagareboshi" Released: July 8, 2015; 4. "Anata ni Smile :)" Released: July 8, 2015; 5. "Orphans no Namida" Released: November 25, 2015

Love Bebop (stylized as LOVE BEBOP) is the twelfth studio album by Japanese singer Misia. It was released on January 6, 2016, through Ariola Japan. The title, which is synonymous with love freestyle, was inspired by the evolving LGBT movement in Japan, leading Misia to draw a parallel between the growing societal recognition for all forms of love and the various messages of love depicted on the album. On the album's eponymous title track, Misia quotes former American president Barack Obama, who declared "love is love" in a speech given in the aftermath of the Supreme Court of the United States's landmark decision to legalize same-sex marriage nationwide. The album yielded five singles, "Shiroi Kisetsu" / "Sakura Hitohira", "Orphans no Namida" and the digital exclusive double A-side single "Nagareboshi" / "Anata ni Smile :)".

== Background and release ==
Misia began working on her next material immediately following the release of her eleventh studio album New Morning, and the conclusion of the Hoshizora no Live VII: 15th Celebration concert tour, in March 2014. She scheduled studio sessions with Shirō Sagisu, whom she had not collaborated with since Soul Quest (2011). The writing and recording process wrapped in October 2015, with Misia holding her final sessions with Sakoshin, another producer she had missed. The pair last worked together on "Catch the Rainbow" (2008). For Love Bebop, she collaborated once again with DJ Gomi, Takayuki Hattori, Hiroshi Matsui and Tohru Shigemi, and brought along new collaborators, including the songwriters her0ism, Ki-Yo, Andreas Öberg, Rica and Shirose, from the band White Jam. The album was primarily recorded in Japan but also internationally, including in London, Dallas and Atlanta.

Love Bebop was released almost two years after her last studio album, New Morning (2014). The first pressing of the record came housed in a digipak and included various album-related stickers and a bonus remix. The album was reissued in limited numbers of 1,000 copies on the eve of Misia's thirty-eighth birthday, July 6, 2016, in 12-inch vinyl format. The analog edition includes three additional remixes, of which two were previously unreleased.

== Critical reception ==
CDJournal praised Misia's voice on the record as "expressive", and stated that her "knock-down" vocal performance "left no stone unturned". Writing for Bounce, Koji Dejima gave Love Bebop a warm review, describing himself as "pleasantly surprised" by the "rhythmic" uptempo tracks on the album, especially in the wake of Misia's performance of "Orphans no Namida" at the 66th NHK Kōhaku Uta Gassen, which Dejima describes as "in line with the image of the powerful diva". He noted the presence of early collaborators of Misia and praised their "lively and emotive" contributions. Dejima remarked that the "exciting charm" of Misia makes Love Bebop an "album to lose yourself in".

== Commercial performance ==
Love Bebop entered the daily Oricon Albums Chart at number 4, where it also peaked. It debuted at number 5 on the weekly Oricon Albums Chart, with sales of 14,000 copies, making it Misia's first studio album since "Just Ballade" (2009) to debut in the top five. The album debuted on the Billboard Japan Hot Albums chart at number 7 and at number 8 on the Top Albums Sales chart. Love Bebop charted for twelve non-consecutive weeks on the Oricon Albums Chart, selling a reported total of 27,000 copies during its run.

== Track listing ==
No.	Title	Writer(s)	Producer(s)	Length
1.	"Anata ni Smile :)"	Misia; Ki-Yo	Hiroshi Matsui	4:16
2.	"Butterfly Butterfly"	Misia; Sakoshin	Sakoshin	4:01
3.	"Love Bebop"	Misia; Sakoshin	Sakoshin	3:14
4.	"Orphans no Namida" (Long Version)	Misia; Shirō Sagisu	Sagisu	5:42
5.	"Mayonaka no Hide-and-seek" (真夜中のHIDE-AND-SEEK, "Midnight Hide-and-seek")	Misia; Sagisu	Sagisu	4:42
6.	"Shiroi Kisetsu"	her0ism; Yuuki Idei	her0ism	5:20
7.	"Hana" (花, "Flower")	Rica	Tohru Shigemi	4:27
8.	"Ashita wa Motto Suki ni Naru" (明日はもっと好きになる, "Love You More Tomorrow")	Misia; her0ism	her0ism	3:42
9.	"Oh Lovely Day"	Misia; Toshiaki Matsumoto	Matsui	4:57
10.	"Freedom"	Misia; Jun Sasaki	DJ Gomi	3:33
11.	"Sakura Hitohira"	Misia; her0ism; Shirose	her0ism	3:49
12.	"Candle of Life"	Misia; her0ism; Alex Niceforo; Andreas Oberg; Erika Fatale	her0ism	4:13
13.	"Nagareboshi"	Rica	Takayuki Hattori	5:37
Total length:				57:33

Limited edition bonus track
No.	Title	Writer(s)	Remixer(s)	Length
14.	"Love Bebop" (Love Is All Remix)	Bob Crewe; Bob Gaudio	Gomi	3:30
Total length:				1:01:15

Analog edition side four bonus tracks
No.	Title	Writer(s)	Remixer(s)	Length
14.	"Love Bebop" (DJ Watarai & DJ Hazime Remix)	Misia; Sakoshin	DJ Watarai; DJ Hazime
15.	"Nagareboshi" (Gomi's Lair Anthem Mix)	Rica	DJ Gomi
16.	"Candle of Life" (Make a Wish Remix)	Misia; her0ism; Niceforo; Oberg; Fatale	DJ Gomi

== Credits and personnel ==
Credits adapted from the liner notes of Love Bebop.

Locations

- Recorded at Orange Peel Recordings, Atlanta; Luminous Sound Studio, Dallas; Abbey Road Studios, London; Eastcote Studios, London; MSR Studios, New York; Germano Studios, New York; Gomi's Lair Recording Studio, New York; Bass Hit Studio, New York; Beethoven Studio, Paris; Rhythmedia Studio, Tokyo; Sony Music Studios Tokyo, Tokyo; Sound Inn, Tokyo
- Mixed at Rhythmedia Studio, Tokyo; Mirrorball Entertainment Studios, Los Angeles; Bass Hit Studio, New York;
- Mastered at Powers Mastering Studio, New York

Personnel

- Lead vocals – Misia
- Backing vocals – Misia, Lorrain Briscoe, Evette Briscoe, Paul Lee, Lyn, Hanah Spring, Sakoshin, Yuho Yoshioka
- Production – DJ Gomi, Takayuki Hattori, her0ism, Hiroshi Matsui, Shirō Sagisu, Sakoshin, Tohru Shigemi
- Programming – DJ Gomi, her0ism, Hiroshi Matsui, Alex Niceforo, Shirō Sagisu, Sakoshin
- Additional instrumentation – DJ Gomi, her0ism, Hiroshi Matsui, Alex Niceforo, Sakoshin
- Piano – Sae Konno, Yasuharu Nakanishi
- Acoustic piano – Yasuharu Nakanishi
- Electronic keyboard – Chris Rob, Tohru Shigemi
- Rhodes – Yasuharu Nakanishi, Mark Walker
- Hammond organ – Mark Walker
- Guitar – Errol Cooney, Koichi Korenaga, Taichi Nakamura, Andrew Smith, Shuhei Yamaguchi, Satoshi Yoshida
- Acoustic guitar – Takayuki Hijikata, Taichi Nakamura
- Electric guitar – Andrew Smith
- Drums – Gary Husband, Lil John Roberts
- Percussions – Karlos Edwards
- Suspended cymbal – Marie Oishi
- Celesta – Sae Konno
- Harp – Skaila Kanga
- English horn – Akiko Mori
- Flugelhorn – Steve Sidwell
- Horns arrangement – Shirō Sagisu, Steve Sidwell
- Trumpet – David Guy, Steve Sidwell
- Saxophone – Ian Hendrickson
- Tenor sax – Dave Bishop, Jamie Talbot
- Baritone sax – Dave Bishop
- Alto sax – Jamie Talbot
- Flute – Jamie Talbot
- Cello – Shinichi Eguchi, Masami Horisawa, Tomoki Iwanaga, Martin Loveday, Jun Nakamura, Takayoshi Okuizumi, Takahiro Yuki
- Bass – Nathan Watts
- Contrabass – Koji Akaike, Shigeki Ippon, Atsushi Kuramochi, Chris Laurence, Yoshinobu Takeshita
- Strings – Koichiro Muroya Strings
- Orchestra – London Studio Orchestra
- Conducting – Takayuki Hattori, Nick Ingman
- Orchestra arrangement – Shirō Sagisu
- Violin – Akane Irie, Naoko Ishibashi, Kyoko Ishigame, Aya Ito, Shizuka Kawaguchi, Perry Montague-Mason, Koichiro Muroya, Aya Notomi, Machi Okabe, Shoko Oki, Natsumi Okimasu, Emlyn Singleton, Toshihiro Takai, Shiori Takeda, Rina Tanaka, Tomomi Tokunaga, Risa Yamamoto, Yuya Yanagihara, Hanako Uesato, Emiko Ujikawa
- Viola – Mikiyo Kikuchi, Peter Lale, Yuya Minorikawa, Saori Oka, Gentaro Sakaguchi, Tomoko Shimaoka, Masaki Shono
- Choir – United Voices
- Choir arrangement – Myron Butler
- Engineering – Jonathan Allen, Raheem Amlani, Philip Bagenal, DJ Gomi, Roy Hendrickson, Masahiro Kawaguchi, Shirō Sagisu, Sakoshin, Kenta Yonesaka
- Mixing – Dave Darlington, Masahiro Kawaguchi, Tony Maserati
- Mastering – Herb Powers Jr.
- Design – Hiroki Kato
- Musician coordinator – Noriko Sekiya
- Art direction – Mitsuo Shindō
- Photography – Kazunali Tajima
- Executive producer – Hiroto Tanigawa

== Charts ==
Chart (2016)	Peak position
Japan Daily Albums (Oricon)	4
Japan Weekly Albums (Oricon)	5
Japan Monthly Albums (Oricon)	18
Japan Hot Albums (Billboard)	7
Japan Top Albums Sales (Billboard)	8
Japan Weekly Albums (Recochoku)	6

== Sales ==
Region	Certification	Certified units/sales
Japan	—	27,000

== Release history ==
Region	Date	Format(s)	Label	Ref.
Japan	January 6, 2016	CD; digital download	Ariola Japan	
Japan	July 6, 2016	LP	Ariola Japan	
Taiwan	January 8, 2016	CD	Sony Music Taiwan	
Various	January 22, 2016	Digital download	Sony Music Taiwan	
