= New Morning (Misia album) =

Studio album by Misia
- Released: April 2, 2014
- Recorded: 2013–2014
- Genre: Pop; R&B; soul
- Length: 1:02:28
- Label: Ariola Japan

Misia chronology
Super Best Records: 15th Celebration (2013)	New Morning (2014)	Love Bebop (2016)

Singles from New Morning
- 1. "Shiawase o Forever" Released: September 4, 2013; 2. "Boku wa Pegasus Kimi wa Polaris" Released: February 5, 2014

New Morning (stylized as NEW MORNING) is the eleventh studio album by Japanese singer Misia. The album was released by Ariola Japan on April 2, 2014, the same day as the 77th and final date of Misia's nationwide Hoshizora no Live VII: 15th Celebration concert tour, at the Bunkamura Orchard Hall, which was broadcast live on YouTube. The album yielded the singles "Shiawase o Forever" and "Boku wa Pegasus Kimi wa Polaris". The lead track "Hope & Dreams" was released as a promotional single for the album.

== Background and release ==
New Morning is Misia's first studio album in close to three years, the first since Soul Quest (2011). It was written and recorded while Misia was on tour to commemorate her 15th anniversary. Misia was still recording songs two months prior to the album's release. She revealed to Oricon in an interview that Gorō Matsui had reached out to her after attending one of her concerts at Yokohama Arena in February 2014, saying he would write her a song. The next day he sent her the lyrics to "My Pride of Love".

The gap between albums felt much shorter to Misia, who remarks that New Morning was mostly written in the previous year and created specifically to ring in the sixteenth year of her career. The concept for the new album revolved around going against the mainstream digital sound and focusing on the use of live, organic instruments. The title of the album is meant to represent renewal and new beginnings. On the way home from shooting the album artwork, which features Misia riding a horse as a nod to her love of equestrianism and 2014 being the Chinese year of the horse, Misia, executive producer Hiroto Tanigawa and art director Mitsuo Shindō were brainstorming on a title for the record when Shindō suggested New Morning, which they all loved and ultimately settled on.

New Morning was released on April 2, 2014. The record was chosen for April release to coincide with the season of spring, which is synonymous with fresh starts. The album was released in two versions, one standard CD-only version and one limited CD/DVD version. The limited edition features two live recordings of "Deepness" and "Back in Love Again" as bonus tracks and comes with a DVD including lives performances from Misia's Hoshizora no Live VII 15th Celebration and Candle Night Fes concert tours and the music video to "Boku wa Pegasus Kimi wa Polaris".

== Critical reception ==
CDJournal described the album as "at times emotional, at times comforting" and praised Misia's "natural and breathy" vocals for "welcoming broken hearts to a sunnier place". Bounce writer Taihei Kubota opined that New Morning is a "collection of diverse love songs", noting that Misia sings about simple things but does so over rich and tasteful medium-tempo and slow tracks. Kubota singles out the opening "Hope & Dreams" and closing "Re-Brain" as displays of variety.

== Commercial performance ==
New Morning entered the daily Oricon Albums Chart at number 2, where it also peaked, with 10,000 copies sold in its first day. It debuted at number 7 on the weekly Oricon Albums Chart, with sales of 19,000 copies. The album also debuted number 7 on the Billboard Japan Top Albums Sales chart. New Morning charted for eleven consecutive weeks on the Oricon Albums Chart, selling a reported total of 33,000 copies during its run.

== Track listing ==
No.	Title	Writer(s)	Arranger(s)	Length
1.	"Hope & Dreams"	Misia; Toshiaki Matsumoto	Gomi	4:59
2.	"Boku wa Pegasus Kimi wa Polaris"	Misia; Hiroaki Yokoyama	Yokoyama	5:00
3.	"Aoi Tsukikage" (蒼い月影, "Blue Moonlight")	Misia; Geila Zilkha; Marie	Tohru Shigemi	4:01
4.	"Ai o Shiru Sekai" (アイヲシルセカイ, "A World That Knows Love")	Misia; Shusui; Albi Albertsson	Shigemi	3:51
5.	"Miss You Always"	Misia; Misako Sakazume	Shigemi	4:22
6.	"Mahō o Kaketa no wa Kimi" (魔法をかけたのは君, "You Put a Spell on Me")	Ellie Omiya; Jun Sasaki	Sasaki	4:27
7.	"Daisy"	Kaori Sawada	Takayuki Hattori	4:53
8.	"Jewelry"	Mayumi Sato; Zilkha	Shigemi	4:31
9.	"Especially for Me"	Misia; Sasaki	Sasaki	4:30
10.	"Shiawase o Forever"	Misia; Matsumoto	Shigemi	4:32
11.	"One Day, One Life"	Omiya; Sasaki	Sasaki	3:25
12.	"Kimi no Taiyō ni Narō" (君の太陽になろう, "I'll Be Your Sun")	Daisuke Mori	Gomi	6:02
13.	"My Pride of Love"	Gorō Matsui; Misia; Shusui; Samuel Waermö	Ichi	3:56
14.	"Re-Brain"	Kazuhiko Gomi; Francis Jocky	Gomi; Jocky	3:53
Total length:				1:02:28

Limited edition bonus tracks
No.	Title	Writer(s)	Length
15.	"Deepness" (from Hoshizora no Live VII: 15th Celebration - Hoshizora Symphony Orchestra @ Nippon Budokan)	Misia; Sasaki	5:29
16.	"Back in Love Again" (from Hoshizora no Live VII: 15th Celebration - Hoshizora Symphony Orchestra @ Nippon Budokan)	Misia; Tomoyasu Hotei	5:14
Total length:			1:13:05

Limited edition DVD: New Special Morning
No.	Title	Director(s)	Length
1.	"Boku wa Pegasus Kimi wa Polaris" (Hoshizora no Live VII: 15th Celebration - Hoshizora Symphony Orchestra @ Yokohama Arena)	Mitsuhiro Izuka	5:18
2.	"Hope & Dreams" (Hoshizora no Live VII: 15th Celebration - Hoshizora Symphony Orchestra @ Yokohama Arena)	Izuka	5:08
3.	"Shiawase o Forever" (Candle Night Fes @ Kawaguchiko Stellar Theater)	Mitsuo Shindō; Mao Muramatsu	5:16
4.	"Daisy" (Candle Night Fes @ Kawaguchiko Stellar Theater)	Shindō; Muramatsu	4:53
5.	"Shiawase o Forever" (Candle Night Fes @ Kawaguchiko Stellar Theater)	Ukon Kamimura	4:59
Total length:			25:34

== Charts ==
Chart (2014)	Peak position
Japan Daily Albums (Oricon)	2
Japan Weekly Albums (Oricon)	7
Japan Monthly Albums (Oricon)	21
Japan Top Albums Sales (Billboard)	7
Korea Weekly Albums (Gaon)	34
Taiwan Weekly Albums (Five Music)	10
Taiwan Weekly Albums (G-Music)	15

== Sales ==
Region	Certification	Certified units/sales
Japan	—	33,000
