= 66th NHK Kōhaku Uta Gassen =

- Also known as: 66th Kouhaku Utagassen: That's Japan! That's Kouhaku!
- Created by: Tsumoru Kondo
- Presented by: Tetsuko Kuroyanagi; Yumiko Udō
- Starring: Haruka Ayase; Yoshihiko Inohara
- Opening theme: "That's Oomisoka"; Yuki Hayashi
- Ending theme: "Hotaru no Hikari"
- Composer: Tsunaki Mihara

Production
- Executive producer: Yuji Itano
- Production locations: NHK Hall; Tokyo, Japan
- Running time: 1st Half: 100 minutes 2nd Half: 165 minutes
- Production company: NHK

Original release
- Network: NHK-G; NHK World Premium; TV Japan (US)
- Release: December 31, 2015

The 66th NHK Kōhaku Uta Gassen (第66回NHK紅白歌合戦) was the 66th edition of NHK's Kōhaku Uta Gassen, held on December 31, 2015, live from NHK Hall from 19:15 (JST) to 23:45 (JST), with a 5-minute break for latest news. This is the 27th Heisei Era edition. Broadcasting time was announced on September 16. The 2015 Broadcast marks the 65th anniversary of Kouhaku Utagassen which started in 1951. The Red Team won this event, beating out The White Team with a final score of 356,832 to 346,929.

== Broadcast ==
Yuji Itano, NHK Broadcasting General-Director, revealed on September 16 that the 66th Kouhaku will air on December 31, starting from 19:15 JST and ending at 23:45 JST, with a 5-minute break for news. On Japan, the broadcast is made by NHK-G and Radio 1, and worldwide by NHK World Premium (Note that airs between 10:15 and 14:45 UTC). Kouhaku airs worldwide since 1998. Viewers outside Japan can watch the Kouhaku on NHK World Premium, at 10:15 UTC airing on a same time with NHK-G.

On November 26, captains and announcers, along with performers were revealed, and this year's theme is "That's Nippon! That's Kōhaku!".

Songs which artists will perform are revealed on December 21, and performance order was announced on Christmas Eve. On December 25, the judges were revealed. Rehearsals took place on 29 and 30 December. On December 31, the festival was broadcast live, culminating in the victory of Akagumi (breaking a sequence of Shirogumi's 3 consecutive wins); Haruka Ayase received the championship flag from the hands of the judge Masato Sakai. This was the first victory of Akagumi since 2011.

With the 2015 victory, Akagumi accumulated 30 wins, while Shirogumi continues with 36 victories.

This Kōhaku is also notable for being the last Kōhaku by former AKB48 general captain and Team A Member Minami Takahashi 1 year prior to her graduation.

== Personnel ==
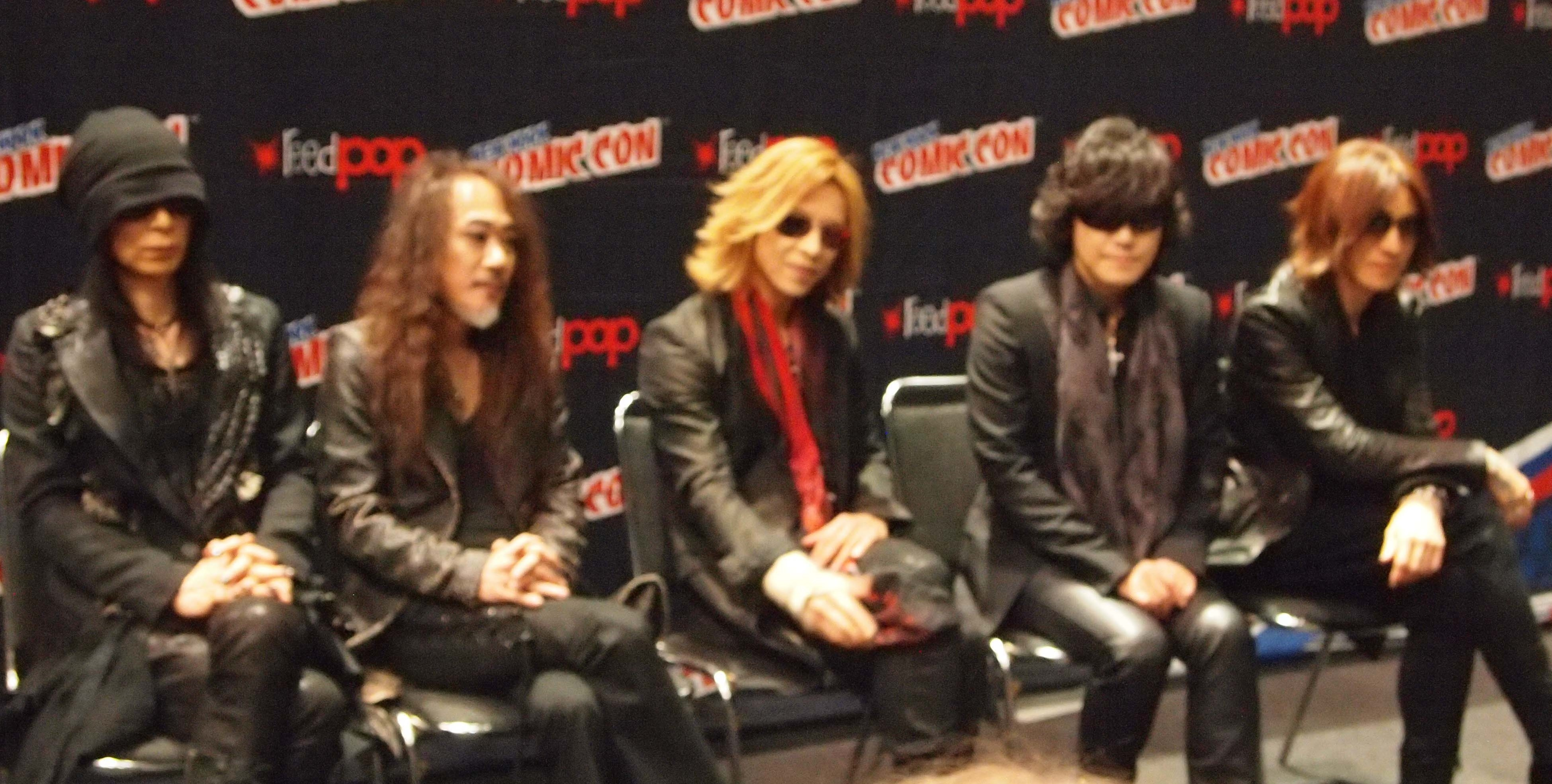
X Japan performed again on Kouhaku after 18 years.

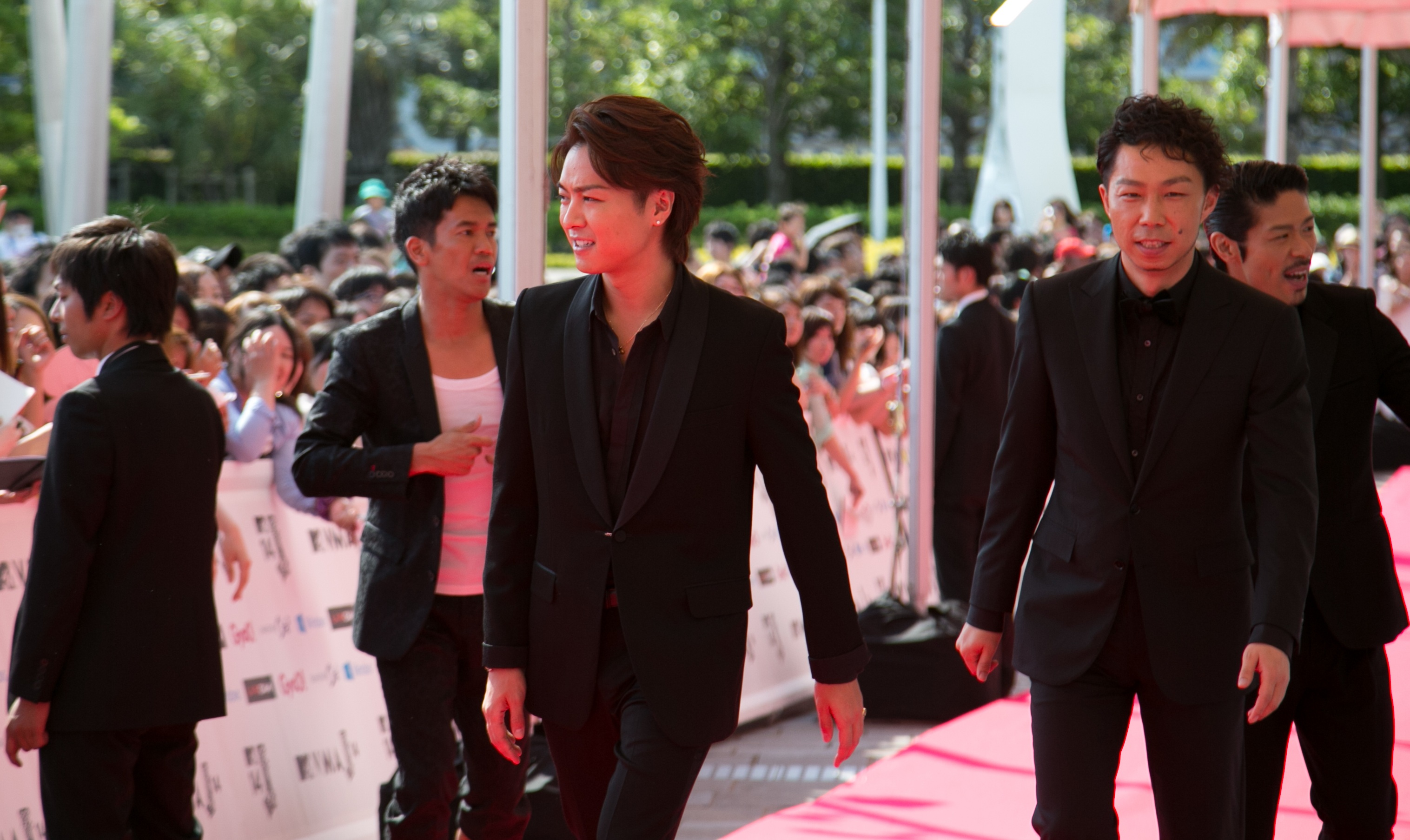
EXILE performed a special medley.

=== Main host and team leaders ===
- Red Team Captain: Haruka Ayase
- White Team Captain: Yoshihiko Inohara (V6)
- Host: Tetsuko Kuroyanagi & Yumiko Udō

=== Live comments ===
- Announcer, NHK Radio 1: Yuka Kubota
- PR, Commentary: Bananaman

=== Judges ===
- Kasumi Arimura (actress), starred in Flying Colors
- Nahoko Uehashi (writer), representative work, Moribito: Guardian of the Spirit
- Yo Oizumi (actor)
- Masato Sakai (actor), will star in Sanada Maru
- Tao Tsuchiya (actress), starred in Mare
- George Tokoro (comedian)
- Masami Nagasawa (actress)
- Yuzuru Hanyu (figure skater)
- Naoki Matayoshi (comedian and writer), won the Akutagawa Prize
- Hiromi Miyake (weightlifter)

=== Contestants ===
This year there were 51 artists in total, 25 for the red team and white team at 26. 10 artists performed for the first time.

Red Team		White Team	
Singer/Group	Performance Time	Singer/Group	Performance Time
E-girls	3	Arashi	7
Ikimonogakari	8	Hiroshi Itsuki	45
Sayuri Ishikawa	38	EXILE	11
Miki Imai	2	X Japan	6
AKB48	8	Kanjani8	4
NMB48	3	Gesu no Kiwami Otome	Debut
Sakurako Ohara	Debut	Go Hiromi	28
Natsuko Godai	22	Golden Bomber	4
Fuyumi Sakamoto	27	Hideaki Tokunaga	10
Ringo Sheena	3	Sandaime J Soul Brothers	4
Aya Shimazu	2	SMAP	23
Superfly	Debut	Sekai no Owari	2
Mariko Takahashi	3	Sexy Zone	3
Yoshimi Tendo	20	TOKIO	22
AAA	6	Masahiko Kondo	10
Kana Nishino	6	Bump of Chicken	Debut
Nogizaka46	Debut	Kiyoshi Hikawa	16
Perfume	8	V6	2
Ayako Fuji	21	Masaharu Fukuyama	8
Seiko Matsuda	19	Gen Hoshino	Debut
Kaori Mizumori	13	Takashi Hosokawa	39
μ's (from Love Live!)	Debut	Keisuke Yamauchi	Debut
Miwa	3	Miwa Akihiro	4
Rebecca	Debut	Shinichi Mori	48
Akiko Wada	39	Hiroshi Miyama	Debut
		Yuzu	6

Special guests

- Misia
- Sachiko Kobayashi
- Darth Vader, Stormtroopers, R2-D2, C-3PO, BB-8 (from Star Wars)
- Mickey & Minnie Mouse
- Asa ga Kita cast
- Princess Tenko (on AKB48's performance)
- Atsuko Maeda (Former AKB48 member)
- Yuko Oshima (Former AKB48 member)
- King Cream Soda (on Anime Kouhaku)
- Kotono Mitsuishi (Sailor Moon voice actress)
- Rika Matsumoto (Ash Ketchum voice actress and former member from JAM Project)
- Ikue Ōtani (Pikachu voice actress)
- Takanori Nishikawa (From T.M.Revolution, not participating on this Kouhaku)

==== Artists not invited this year ====
RED TEAM
Ayaka, Nana Mizuki, Momoiro Clover Z, Kyary Pamyu Pamyu, SKE48, HKT48, Kaori Kozai, Sayaka Kanda, Miyuki Nakajima, Hiroko Yakushimaru, May J., Yoshino Nanjou
WHITE TEAM
Tsuyoshi Nagabuchi, T.M.Revolution, Chris Hart, Kouhei Fukuda, Pornograffiti.

== Performance order ==
It was announced on December 24. Go Hiromi and Sakurako Ohara were the first artists to perform. The finalistas (Ootori) were Masahiko Kondo and Seiko Matsuda. Two artists performed live from a remote location: Masaharu Fukuyama (from Pacific Convention Plaza) and Bump of Chicken (from Makuhari Messe). This was the last appearance of Shinichi Mori (who announced his honorable retirement from Kouhaku). AAA, for being a mixed musical group, served again in Akagumi.

First Part (19h15-20h55 JST)

- "That's Oomisoka"
  Opening Theme
- "2-Oku 4-Senman no Hitomi ~Exotic Japan~"
  Go Hiromi
- "Hitomi"
  Sakurako Ohara
- "Nippon Cha-Cha-Cha Champion"
  Sexy Zone
- "Tokyo Gorin Ondou"
  Natsuko Godai
- "Kimi no Na wa Kibou"
  Nogizaka46
- "Oiyakiyama"
  Hiroshi Miyama
- "Dance Dance Dance"
  E-Girls
- "Present"
  Sekai no Owari
- "Iwai Zake"
  Fuyumi Sakamoto
- "Jidai"
  Hideaki Tokunaga
- Anime Kouhaku
  - "Moonlight Densetsu" (Sailor Moon) AKB48
  - "Mezase Pokémon Master" (Pokémon) Golden Bomber
  - "Tobe! Gundam" (Gundam) Tokio
  - "Zankoku na Tenshi no Thesis" (Neon Genesis Evangelion) Miwa + Sayuri Ishikawa
  - "Odoru Pompokolin" (Chibi Maruko-chan) E-Girls + Sakurako Ohara
  - "Gera Gera Po no Uta" (Yo-kai Watch) King Cream Soda + All Stars
  - "Tetsuwam Atom" (Astro Boy) V6 + All Stars
- "Sore wa Bokutachi no Kiseki"
  μ's
- "Spotlight"
  Keisuke Yamauchi
- "Koioto to Amazora"
  AAA
- "Sun"
  Gen Hoshino
- "Kaeranchyaoka"
  Aya Shimazu
- "Watashi Igai Watashi Janai no"
  Gesu no Kiwami Otome
- "Manjishaka"
  Ayako Fuji
- "Kakeru"
  Yuzu
- "Fighting-Ø-Girls"
  Miwa
- "Otokobana"
  Kiyoshi Hikawa
- "Kokoro no Kori"
  Takashi Hosokawa
- "Waratte Yurushite"
  Akiko Wada
- "Maemuki Scream!"
  Kanjani8
- "Jinsei Ichiro"
  Yoshimi Tendo

Last Part (21h00-23h45 JST)

- "365 Nichi no Kamihikouki"
  NMB48 with Sayaka Yamamoto on acoustic guitar
- "Summer Madness"
  Sandaime J Soul Brothers from EXILE TRIBE
- "25th Anniversary Debut Special Medley"
  Masaharu Fukuyama
- "Yamatoji no Koi"
  Kaori Mizumori
- "Arigatou"
  Ikimonogakari
- That's SHOWTIME! ~Hoshi ni Negai wo~
  - "Wish" Medley Hoshi ni Negai wo ~Yume wa Hisoka ni~
    Haruka Ayase, Yoshihiko Inohara, V6 & Perfume
- "Ambitious Japan"
  Tokio
- "Nagaku Mijikai Matsuri ~Koko wa Jigoku ka Tengoku ka-hen~"
  Ringo Sheena
- "New Year's Eve Medley 2015"
  Arashi
- "AKB Kouhaku 2015 SP ~10th Anniversary~"
  AKB48 ft Princess Tenko
- "Exile Kouhaku Special 2015"
  Exile
- "Hana wa Saku"
  Sho Sakurai & Yoshiki, ft Yuzuru Hanyu
- "Beautiful"
  Superfly
- "Memeshikute"
  Golden Bomber
- "Torisetsu"
  Kana Nishino
- "Ray"
  Bump of Chicken
- "Tsugaru Kaikyo Fuyugeshiki"
  Sayuri Ishikawa
- "Chikumagawa"
  Hiroshi Itsuki
- "That's! V6 Medley"
  V6
- "Pick Me Up"
  Perfume
- "Senbonzakura"
  Sachiko Kobayashi (Original recorded by Hatsune Miku)
- "Kouhaku Special Medley ~We Are X!~"
  X Japan
- "Orphans no Namida"
  Misia
- "Yoitomake no Uta"
  Miwa Akihiro
- "Friends"
  Rebecca
- "Piece of My Wish"
  Miki Imai
- "This is SMAP Medley"
  SMAP
- "Ofukurusan"
  Shinichi Mori
- "Goban Machi no Mari e 2015"
  Mariko Takahashi
- "Gin Gira Gin ni Sariginaku"
  Masahiko Kondo
- "Akai Sweet Pea"
  Seiko Matsuda
- "Hotaru no Hikari"
  Finale conducted by Maasaki Hirao

Songs performed on medleys

- Masaharu Fukuyama "I Am A HERO", "Niji", "Hello", "Sakurazaka"
- Arashi: "Sakura", "Ai wo Sakebe"
- AKB48: "Aitakatta", "Flying Get", "Heavy Rotation", "Koisuru Fortune Cookie"
- Exile: "24karats Gold Soul", "Rising Sun"
- V6: "Music For The People", "Ai Nanda"
- X Japan: "Forever Love", "Born to Be Free"
- SMAP: "Triangle", "Otherside"
- Mariko Takahashi: "Goban Machi no Mari e", "Momoiro Toiki"

=== Staff ===
- Produced by: NHK Enterprise
- Executive Producer: Yuji Itano
- AKB48 SHOW Producer: Masashi Nishi
- AKB48 SHOW Director: Tomoko Matsuda
- Original Concept: Tsumoru Kondo
- Music Producer: Tsunaki Mihara (The New Breed)
- "Hotaru no Hikari" Conductor: Maasaki Hirao
- "Moonlight Densetsu" performers: Mayu Watanabe, Sakura Miyawaki, Haruka Kodama, Haruka Shimazaki, Anna Iriyama (AKB48)

=== Final results and ratings ===
Final Results
Votes	Akagumi	Shirogumi
Partials	168.179	179.230
Overall	356.832	346.929
Individual Results; TV, 1-Seg, Apps & NHK Hall
DTV	246.705	236.986
1-Seg	9.286	10.652
App Android	99.554	97.871
NHK Hall	1.287	1.420
Winner Team: Red
Ratings; Kanto: 34,8% (1st Part) & 39,2% (2nd Part); Kansai: 36,8% (1st Part) & 42,2% (2nd Part)

== Production ==
Every year, representatives of each of the two teams in Kōhaku are announced between the 1st and 15 October, and the artists who will participate are disclosed in late November. However, this year, according to some news portals and Japanese newspapers reported, NHK had to delay the announcement of representatives after Tamori, renowned Japanese TV host, refused participation in Kōhaku. In response, NHK started searching for another representative. Rumors began to surface that Yoshihiko Inohara (V6) would serve as Tamori's replacement. Both representatives and participating artists were announced on November 26, the day the line-up is traditionally revealed.

Haruka Ayase received the Championship Flag from guest judge Masato Sakai.
