= Nagareboshi (Misia song) =

Single by Misia

from the album Love Bebop
- Released: 8 July 2015
- Studio: Rhythmedia Studio
- Genre: Soul; pop
- Length: 5:37
- Label: Ariola Japan
- Songwriter: Rica
- Producer: Takayuki Hattori

Misia singles chronology
"Shiroi Kisetsu" / "Sakura Hitohira" (2015)	"Nagareboshi" / "Anata ni Smile :)" (2015)	"Orphans no Namida" (2015)

Audio sample
- "Nagareboshi": file; help

"Nagareboshi" (流(なが)れ星(ぼし); lit. "Shooting Star") is a song recorded by Japanese singer Misia. It was released by Ariola Japan as the third single from her twelfth studio album, Love Bebop (2016) on 8 July 2015, one day after Misia's 37th birthday. The song was written by Japanese singer-songwriter Rica and arranged and produced by Takayuki Hattori. "Nagareboshi" is the theme song to the 2015 film S The Last Policeman - Recovery of Our Future, a continuing film adaptation based on the television series of the same name, for which Misia's "Boku wa Pegasus Kimi wa Polaris" served as theme song. The digital single artwork was painted by author, screenwriter, director and painter Ellie Omiya.

== Background and release ==
"Nagareboshi" was performed in concert, throughout Misia's Hoshizora no Live VIII Moon Journey concert tour, well before its official release and for the first time on 11 April 2015. On 29 June 2015, an exclusive minute-long trailer for the film S The Last Policeman – Recovery of Our Future featuring "Nagareboshi" was uploaded onto Misia's official YouTube channel. "Nagareboshi" was released alongside the song "Anata ni Smile :)" as a double A-side single for download only on 8 July 2015. A CD single was released on 29 August 2015 for limited rental in Tsutaya stores exclusively. This release included two bonus live recordings from Misia's 2 April 2014 concert at the Bunkamura Orchard Hall of the songs "Boku wa Pegasus Kimi wa Polaris" and "One Day, One Life" from the album New Morning (2014).

== Composition ==
"Nagareboshi" is a piano and strings-driven ballad with lyrics comparing human individuals and their potential to the motion and light of shooting stars. The song was initially written and recorded by Japanese singer-songwriter Rica for her album Grain (2015). The song was eventually re-recorded by Misia whose version was produced by Takayuki Hattori. The piano was played by Sae Konno and the strings, an ensemble of ten musicians on first violin, eight on second violin, six violists, and six cellists, were conducted by Hattori. The instrumentation and vocals were recorded in Tokyo, Japan, at Rhythmedia Studio and Sound Inn. "Nagareboshi" is written in the key of B major. Misia's vocals span from G♯_{3} to B_{4}.

== Chart performance ==
"Nagareboshi" debuted at number 27 on the weekly Recochoku Singles chart and at number 4 on the weekly RecoChoku Albums chart.

== Track listing ==
No.	Title	Writer(s)	Producer(s)	Length
1.	"Nagareboshi"	Rica	Takayuki Hattori	5:37
2.	"Anata ni Smile :)" (あなたにスマイル:), Anata ni Sumairu :), "Smile at You :)")	Misia; Ki-Yo	Hiroshi Matsui	4:16
3.	"Ashita wa Motto Suki ni Naru" (明日はもっと好きになる, "Love You More Tomorrow")	Misia; Her0ism	Her0ism	3:42
4.	"Nagareboshi" (Hoshizora Version)	Rica		5:01
Total length:				18:36

Tsutaya rental CD single
No.	Title	Writer(s)	Producer(s)	Length
1.	"Anata ni Smile :)"	Misia; Ki-Yo	Matsui	4:16
2.	"Nagareboshi"	Rica	Hattori	5:37
4.	"Boku wa Pegasus Kimi wa Polaris" (Hoshizora Live 7 @ Bunkamura Orchard Hall)	Misia; Hiroaki Yokoyama	Yokoyama
5.	"One Day, One Life" (Hoshizora Live 7 @ Bunkamura Orchard Hall)	Ellie Omiya; Jun Sasaki	Sasaki

== Credits and personnel ==
Recording

- Recorded at: Rhythmedia Studio, Tokyo, Japan; Sound Inn, Tokyo, Japan.
- Mixed at: Rhythmedia Studio in Tokyo, Japan.

Personnel

- Vocals – Misia
- Songwriting – Rica
- Arrangement, conducting, production – Takayuki Hattori
- Piano, celesta – Sae Konno
- Contrabass – Koji Akaike, Shigeki Ippon, Atsushi Kuramochi, Yoshinobu Takeshita
- Cello – Shin'ichi Eguchi, Masami Horisawa, Tomoki Iwanaga, Jun Nakamura, Takayoshi Okuizumi, Takahiro Yuki
- First violin – Kyoko Ishigame, Aya Ito, Koichiro Muroya, Aya Notomi, Machi Okabe, Shoko Oki, Natsumi Okimasu, Rina Tanaka, Tomomi Tokunaga, Yuya Yanagihara
- Second violin – Akane Irie, Naoko Ishibashi, Shizuka Kawaguchi, Toshiro Takai, Shiori Takeda, Risa Yamamoto, Hanako Uesato, Emiko Ujikawa
- Viola – Mikiyo Kikuchi, Yuya Minorikawa, Saori Oka, Gentaro Sakaguchi, Tomoko Shimaoka, Masaki Shono
- English horn – Akiko Mori
- Suspended cymbal – Marie Oishi
- Musician coordinator – Noriko Sekiya
- Engineering, mixing – Masahiro Kawaguchi
- Mastering – Herb Powers, Jr.

== Charts ==
Chart (2015)	Peak position
Japan Weekly Singles (Recochoku)	27
Japan Weekly Albums (Recochoku)	4
