= Hope & Dreams =

Promotional single by Misia

from the album New Morning
- Released: March 19, 2014
- Genre: Dance-pop
- Length: 4:59
- Label: Ariola Japan
- Songwriter(s): Misia; Toshiaki Matsumoto

Audio sample
- "Hope & Dreams": file; help

"Hope & Dreams" (stylized as "HOPE & DREAMS") is a song recorded by Japanese singer Misia for her eleventh studio album New Morning. It was released digitally as a promotional single by Ariola Japan on March 19, 2014.

== Background and release ==
"Hope & Dreams" was released to digital download on iTunes and Mora on March 19, 2014, two weeks before the release of New Morning. Misia premiered the song in concert, during her Hoshizora no Live VII 15th Celebration concert tour. Misia also performed the song at the opening ceremony of the 6th Special Olympics Nippon National Summer Games, held in Fukuoka on November 1, 2014.

== Composition ==
"Hope & Dreams" was written by Misia, composed by Toshiaki Matsumoto and arranged by DJ Gomi. The trio set out to create a danceable song with an uplifting message. The song was the official song for the pride event Tokyo Rainbow Week 2014, where Misia was recognized for her contribution with the Culture Award.

== Chart performance ==
"Hope & Dreams" charted at number 97 on the Billboard Japan Hot 100.

== Credits and personnel ==
Personnel

- Vocals – Misia
- Backing vocals – Adam Joseph
- Songwriting – Misia, Toshiaki Matsumoto
- Arrangement, programming – DJ Gomi
- Strings arrangement, conducting – Takayuki Hattori
- Guitar – Yasuo Yamada
- Strings group – Gen Ittetsu Strings
- First violin – Gen Ittetsu, Reina Ushiyama, Cameroun Maki, Kaoru Kuroki, Yayoi Fujita, Tomoshige Yamamoto
- Second violin – Takuya Mori, Yuko Kajitani, Azusa Kawasuso, Kiyo Kido, Kazuha Takahashi
- Viola – Daisuke Kadowaki, Kumi Nakajima, Chikako Nishimura, Shoko Miki
- Cello – Masami Horisawa, Toshiyuki Muranaka
- Mixing – Dave Darlington
- Engineering – Masahiro Kawaguchi, DJ Gomi
- Mastering – Herb Powers Jr.

== Charts ==
Chart (2014)	Peak position
Japan Hot 100 (Billboard)	97
