= Sakura Hitohira =

Single by Misia

from the album Love Bebop
- Released: February 18, 2015
- Genre: Pop
- Length: 3:52
- Label: Ariola Japan
- Songwriter(s): Misia; her0ism; Shirose
- Producer(s): her0ism

Misia singles chronology
"Boku wa Pegasus Kimi wa Polaris" (2014)	"Sakura Hitohira" / "Shiroi Kisetsu" (2015)	"Nagareboshi" / "Anata ni Smile :)" (2015)

"Sakura Hitohira" (桜(さくら)ひとひら, lit. "Cherry Blossom Petal") is a song recorded by Japanese singer Misia, from the album Love Bebop. It was released as the album's second single digitally on February 11, 2015, through Ariola Japan. It was released as a limited double A-side CD single alongside the song "Shiroi Kisetsu" a week later, on February 18, 2015. The song was written by Misia, composed by her0ism and Shirose, from the band White Jam, and arranged and produced by her0ism. It was written specifically for the three-night TX drama The Eternal Zero, adapted from the film by the same name and starring Osamu Mukai, for which it serves as theme song.

== Background and release ==
"Sakura Hitohira" was promoted as being Misia's first Sakura song, a longstanding thematic in Japanese music. On January 22, a trailer for the single was uploaded on Misia's official YouTube channel. The single features three B-sides: the Shiro Sagisu-produced "Mayonaka no Hide-and-seek", "Candle of Life", which Misia first performed during the 2014 installment of her Misia Candle Night concert series, and lastly a remix of the latter track. The CD single cover artwork was designed by longtime collaborator Mitsuo Shindō and photographed by Kristian Schmidt.

== Composition ==
"Sakura Hitohira" is written in the key of F-sharp minor with a common time tempo of 82 beats per minute. Misia's vocals span from A_{3} to C♯_{5}.

== Chart performance ==
"Sakura Hitohira" debuted at number 9 on the weekly Recochoku Singles chart. The CD single made its debut at number 24 on the Oricon Singles Chart, with 4,000 copies sold in its first charting week. It charted for nine consecutive weeks and sold a reported total of 9,000 copies.

== Track listing ==
No.	Title	Writer(s)	Producer(s)	Length
1.	"Shiroi Kisetsu"	her0ism; Yuuki Idei	her0ism	5:19
2.	"Sakura Hitohira" (桜ひとひら, "Cherry Blossom Petal")	Misia; her0ism; Shirose	her0ism	3:52
3.	"Mayonaka no Hide-and-seek" (真夜中のHIDE-AND-SEEK, "Midnight Hide-and-seek")	Misia; Shiro Sagisu	Sagisu	4:44
4.	"Candle of Life"	Misia; her0ism; Alex Niceforo; Andreas Öberg; Erika Fatale	her0ism	4:15
5.	"Candle of Life" (Make a Wish Remix)	Misia; her0ism; Niceforo; Öberg; Fatale	DJ Gomi	5:03
Total length:				23:13

Limited CD single hidden track
No.	Title	Writer(s)	Length
6.	"Shiroi Kisetsu" (Piano Version)	her0ism; Idei	4:12
Total length:			27:25

== Credits and personnel ==
Personnel

- Vocals, backing vocals – Misia
- Songwriting – Misia, her0ism, Shirose
- Arrangement, programming, all other instruments – her0ism
- Electronic keyboard – Chris Rob
- Drums – Lil' John Roberts
- Bass – Nathan Watts
- Guitar – Errol Cooney
- Acoustic guitar – Taichi Nakamura
- Mixing – Tony Maserati
- Engineering – Masahiro Kawaguchi, Raheem Amlani
- Mastering – Herb Powers Jr.

== Charts ==
Chart (2015)	Peak position	Sales
Japan Daily Singles (Oricon)	20	9,000
Japan Weekly Singles (Oricon)	24	9,000
Japan Hot Singles Sales (Billboard)	21	9,000
Japan Weekly Singles (Recochoku)	9	9,000
