= Anata ni Smile :) =

Single by Misia

from the album Love Bebop
- Released: 8 July 2015
- Studio: Rhythmedia Studio
- Genre: Pop; R&B; soul
- Length: 4:16
- Label: Ariola Japan
- Songwriters: Misia; Ki-Yo
- Producer: Hiroshi Matsui

Misia singles chronology
"Shiroi Kisetsu" / "Sakura Hitohira" (2015)	"Anata ni Smile :)" / "Nagareboshi" (2015)	"Orphans no Namida" (2015)

Audio sample
- file; help

"Anata ni Smile :)" (あなたにスマイル:), Anata ni Sumairu :); lit. "Smile at You :)") is a song recorded by Japanese singer Misia. It was released by Ariola Japan as the fourth single from her twelfth studio album, Love Bebop (2016) on 8 July 2015, one day after Misia's 37th birthday. The song was co-written by Misia and Ki-Yo, composed by the latter and produced by Hiroshi Matsui. "Anata ni Smile :)" was used in television ads for Kirin's Sekai no Kitchen Kara tea, for which a special version with alternate lyrics was recorded. The digital single artwork was painted by author, screenwriter, director and painter Ellie Omiya.

== Background and release ==
The instrumentation for the track was recorded at Luminous Sound Studio in Dallas, Texas. The song features the gospel choir United Voices. The choir arrangement was produced by Myron Butler, who also directed the ensemble. The vocals were recorded and mixed at Rhythmedia Studio, in Tokyo, Japan. "Anata ni Smile :)" was first performed in concert on 11 June 2015. The song was released as a digital double A-side single, alongside the song "Nagareboshi" on 8 July 2015. A CD single was issued on 29 August 2015 for limited rental in Tsutaya stores exclusively. This release included two bonus live recordings from Misia's 2 April 2014 concert at the Bunkamura Orchard Hall of the songs "Boku wa Pegasus Kimi wa Polaris" and "One Day, One Life", from the album New Morning (2014).

== Composition ==
"Anata ni Smile :)" was co-written by Misia and Ki-Yo and produced by Hiroshi Matsui. Set to an uptempo R&B track and accompanied by a gospel choir in the background, Misia sings about expressing love through a smile. The song is written in the key of E flat major. Misia's vocals span from B♭_{3} to F_{5} in modal voice, and up to B♭_{5} in head voice.

== Chart performance ==
"Anata ni Smile :)" entered at number 81 on the Billboard Japan Radio Songs chart and at number 4 on the weekly RecoChoku Albums Chart.

== Track listing ==
No.	Title	Writer(s)	Producer(s)	Length
1.	"Nagareboshi"	Rica	Takayuki Hattori	5:37
2.	"Anata ni Smile :)" (あなたにスマイル:), Anata ni Sumairu :), "Smile at You :)")	Misia; Ki-Yo	Hiroshi Matsui	4:16
3.	"Ashita wa Motto Suki ni Naru" (明日はもっと好きになる, "Love You More Tomorrow")	Misia; Her0ism	Her0ism	3:42
4.	"Nagareboshi" (Hoshizora Version)	Rica		5:01
Total length:				18:36

Tsutaya rental CD single
No.	Title	Writer(s)	Producer(s)	Length
1.	"Anata ni Smile :)"	Misia; Ki-Yo	Matsui	4:16
2.	"Nagareboshi"	Rica	Hattori	5:37
4.	"Boku wa Pegasus Kimi wa Polaris" (Hoshizora Live 7 @ Bunkamura Orchard Hall)	Misia; Hiroaki Yokoyama	Yokoyama
5.	"One Day, One Life" (Hoshizora Live 7 @ Bunkamura Orchard Hall)	Ellie Omiya; Jun Sasaki	Sasaki

== Credits and personnel ==
Recording

- Recorded at: Luminous Sound Studio, Dallas, Texas; Rhythmedia Studio, Tokyo, Japan.
- Mixed at: Rhythmedia Studio in Tokyo, Japan.

Personnel

- Misia – lead vocals, songwriting
- Myron Butler – choir arrangement and direction
- DJ Gomi – oversea direction
- David Guy – trumpet
- Ian Hendrickson – sax
- Roy Hendrickson – engineering
- Masahiro Kawaguchi – engineering, mixing
- Ki-Yo – songwriting
- Hiroshi Matsui – additional instrumentation, producer, programming
- United Voices – choir
- Kenta Yonesaka – engineering

== Charts ==
Chart (2015)	Peak position
Japan Radio Songs (Billboard)	81
Japan Weekly Albums (RecoChoku)	4
