= Shiawase o Forever =

Single by Misia

from the album New Morning
- Released: September 4, 2013
- Genre: Pop; gospel
- Length: 4:34
- Label: Ariola Japan
- Songwriters: Misia; Toshiaki Matsumoto
- Producer: Tohru Shigemi

Misia singles chronology
"Maware Maware" (2013)	"Shiawase o Forever" (2013)	"Boku wa Pegasus Kimi wa Polaris" (2014)

Music video
- "Shiawase o Forever" on YouTube

"Shiawase o Forever" (幸(しあわ)せをフォーエバー, Shiawase o Fōebā; lit. "Happy Forever") is a song recorded by Japanese singer Misia, from her eleventh studio album New Morning. It was released as the album's lead single by Ariola Japan on September 4, 2013. The song was used in a promotional campaign and televised commercials for the bridal magazine Zexy, starring thirty owarai comedians and Airi Matsui.

== Background and composition ==
"Shiawase o Forever" is Misia's first physical single release in over eight months, since "Back in Love Again". The title track was written by Misia and composed by Toshiaki Matsumoto, their first collaboration on a single since "Hatenaku Tsuzuku Story" (2002). The song is written in the key of A major with a common time tempo of 74 beats per minute. Misia's vocals span two octaves, from E_{3} to E_{5}. The B-side "Daisy" was written by Japanese singer-songwriter Kaori Sawada, who toured with Misia as backing vocalist on her Hoshizora no Live VII 15th Celebration concert tour, as well as on the Misia Candle Night Fes. tour, where Misia debuted "Shiawase o Forever".

== Music video ==
The music video to "Shiawase o Forever" was written and directed by Ellie Omiya. It is set at the wedding reception of a couple, played by Noriyuki Higashiyama and Kazue Fukiishi, and features flashbacks that depict their relationship from the budding stage all the way to their wedding day. These flashbacks at interspersed between past and present shots of guests, portrayed by several actors and comedians, including Kazuya Kojima and Asako Ito, showing us their involvement in the shaping of their love story. Omiya jokingly commented that she wanted to create a music video that would entice people to get married so they could resolve Japan's declining birth rate.

== Critical reception ==
CDJournal critics acclaimed Misia for "hitting the nail on the head" with "Shiawase o Forever". They described the song as "tasteful" and predicted it would surely become a new standard at weddings.

== Chart performance ==
"Shiawase o Forever" debuted at number 26 on the weekly Oricon Singles Chart, with 3,000 copies sold. It charted for five weeks and sold a reported total of 5,000 copies during its run.

== Track listing ==
No.	Title	Writer(s)	Arranger(s)	Length
1.	"Shiawase o Forever" (幸せをフォーエバー, Shiawase o Fōebā, "Happy Forever")	Misia; Toshiaki Matsumoto	Tohru Shigemi	4:34
2.	"Daisy"	Kaori Sawada	Takayuki Hattori	4:55
3.	"Shiawase o Forever" (Orchestra Version)	Misia; Matsumoto	Shigemi	5:10
4.	"Shiawase o Forever" (Instrumental)	Matsumoto	Shigemi	4:31
Total length:				19:11

"Extended Version" bonus track
No.	Title	Writer(s)	Arranger(s)	Length
4.	"Shiawase o Forever" (Gomi's Happiness Is Forever Remix)	Misia; Matsumoto	DJ Gomi	5:14
Total length:				24:24

== Credits and personnel ==
Personnel

- Vocals – Misia
- Backing vocals – Hanah Spring, Kaori Sawada, Lyn
- Songwriting – Misia, Toshiaki Matsumoto
- Arrangement, production, harpsichord – Tohru Shigemi
- Drums – Fuyu
- Bass – Jino
- Guitar – Shuhei Yamaguchi
- Tubular bells – Tamao Fujii
- Engineering, mixing – Masahiro Kawaguchi
- Mastering – Herb Powers Jr.

== Charts ==
Chart (2013)	Peak position	Sales
Japan Daily Singles (Oricon)	19	5,000
Japan Weekly Singles (Oricon)	26	5,000
Japan Hot 100 (Billboard)	23	5,000
Japan Adult Contemporary Airplay (Billboard)	22	5,000
Japan Hot Top Airplay (Billboard)	35	5,000
Japan Hot Singles Sales (Billboard)	25	5,000
Japan Weekly Singles (Recochoku)	23	5,000
