= Shiroi Kisetsu =

Single by Misia

from the album Love Bebop
- Released: February 18, 2015
- Genre: Pop
- Length: 5:19
- Label: Ariola Japan
- Songwriter(s): her0ism; Yuuki Idei
- Producer(s): her0ism

Misia singles chronology
| "Boku wa Pegasus Kimi wa Polaris" (2014) | "Shiroi Kisetsu" / "Sakura Hitohira" (2015) | "Nagareboshi" / "Anata ni Smile :)" (2015) |

Music video
- "Shiroi Kisetsu" on YouTube

"Shiroi Kisetsu" (白(しろ)い季節(きせつ), lit. "White Season") is a song recorded by Japanese singer Misia, from the album Love Bebop. It was released as the album's lead single digitally on February 4, 2015, through Ariola Japan. It was released as a limited double A-side CD single alongside the song "Sakura Hitohira" a week later, on February 18, 2015. The song was co-written by her0ism and Yuuki Idei, and arranged and produced by her0ism. The song is featured as theme song on the soundtrack of the EX drama series Second Love starring Kazuya Kamenashi and Kyoko Fukada. The limited physical release includes a piano rendition of "Shiroi Kisetsu" as a hidden track.

== Background and release ==
On January 22, a trailer for the single was uploaded on Misia's official YouTube channel. The single features three B-sides: the Shiro Sagisu-produced "Mayonaka no Hide-and-seek", "Candle of Life", which Misia first performed during the 2014 installment of her Misia Candle Night concert series, and lastly a remix of the latter track. The CD single cover artwork was designed by longtime collaborator Mitsuo Shindō and photographed by Kristian Schmidt.

== Composition ==
"Shiroi Kisetsu" is written in the key of B-flat major with a common time tempo of 78 beats per minute. Misia's vocals span from F_{3} to D_{5} in modal voice, and up to E_{5} in head voice.

== Chart performance ==
"Shiroi Kisetsu" debuted at number 7 on the weekly Recochoku Singles chart. The CD single made its debut at number 24 on the Oricon Singles Chart, with 4,000 copies sold in its first charting week. It charted for nine consecutive weeks and sold a reported total of 9,000 copies.

== Track listing ==
| No. | Title | Writer(s) | Producer(s) | Length |
|---|---|---|---|---|
| 1. | "Shiroi Kisetsu" (白い季節, "White Season") | her0ism; Yuuki Idei | her0ism | 5:19 |
| 2. | "Sakura Hitohira" | Misia; her0ism; Shirose | her0ism | 3:52 |
| 3. | "Mayonaka no Hide-and-seek" (真夜中のHIDE-AND-SEEK, "Midnight Hide-and-seek") | Misia; Shiro Sagisu | Sagisu | 4:44 |
| 4. | "Candle of Life" | Misia; Her0ism; Alex Niceforo; Andreas Öberg; Erika Fatale | Her0ism | 4:15 |
| 5. | "Candle of Life" (Make a Wish Remix) | Misia; Her0ism; Niceforo; Öberg; Fatale | DJ Gomi | 5:03 |
| Total length: | | | | 23:13 |

Limited CD single hidden track
| No. | Title | Writer(s) | Length |
|---|---|---|---|
| 6. | "Shiroi Kisetsu" (Piano Version) | Her0ism; Yuuki Idei | 4:12 |
| Total length: | | | 27:25 |

== Credits and personnel ==
Personnel

- Vocals, backing vocals – Misia
- Songwriting – her0ism, Yuuki Idei
- Arrangement, programming, all other instruments – her0ism
- Electronic keyboard – Chris Rob
- Drums – Lil' John Roberts
- Bass – Nathan Watts
- Guitar – Errol Cooney
- Mixing – Tony Maserati
- Engineering – Masahiro Kawaguchi, Raheem Amlani
- Mastering – Herb Powers Jr.

== Charts ==
| Chart (2015) | Peak position | Sales |
|---|---|---|
| Japan Daily Singles (Oricon) | 20 | 9,000 |
| Japan Weekly Singles (Oricon) | 24 | 9,000 |
| Japan Hot 100 (Billboard) | 34 | 9,000 |
| Japan Adult Contemporary Airplay (Billboard) | 13 | 9,000 |
| Japan Hot Top Airplay (Billboard) | 33 | 9,000 |
| Japan Hot Singles Sales (Billboard) | 21 | 9,000 |
| Japan Weekly Singles (Recochoku) | 7 | 9,000 |
