= Boku wa Pegasus Kimi wa Polaris =

Single by Misia

from the album New Morning
- Released: February 5, 2014
- Genre: Pop
- Length: 5:01
- Label: Ariola Japan
- Songwriter(s): Misia; Hiroaki Yokoyama
- Producer(s): Tohru Shigemi

Misia singles chronology
"Shiawase o Forever" (2013)	"Boku wa Pegasus Kimi wa Polaris" (2014)	"Shiroi Kisetsu" / "Sakura Hitohira" (2015)

Audio sample
- file; help

"Boku wa Pegasus Kimi wa Polaris" (僕(ぼく)はペガサス 君(きみ)はポラリス, Boku wa Pegasasu Kimi wa Porarisu, lit. "I Am Pegasus, You Are Polaris") is a song recorded by Japanese singer Misia for her eleventh studio album New Morning. It was released as the album's second single by Ariola Japan on February 5, 2014. The title track was released digitally and serviced to radio two weeks prior, on January 22, 2014. It is the theme song to the TBS drama series S Saigo no Keikan, starring Osamu Mukai and Gō Ayano. Misia first performed "Boku wa Pegasus Kimi wa Polaris" on January 18, 2014 at Nippon Budokan during the Hoshizora no Live VII concert tour.

== Background and release ==
"Boku wa Pegasus Kimi wa Polaris" is Misia's first single in five months, since "Shiawase o Forever" (2013). The first pressing of the single included a live take of "Koi wa Owaranai Zutto" recorded at the Kawaguchiko Stellar Theater on August 26, 2012 as a bonus track. The CD single features two B-sides, including "Kimi no Taiyō ni Narō, which was used in television commercials for Seiko's Lukia watches, starring Emi Takei. The second, "Jewelry", is the last song recorded by drummer and longtime Misia collaborator Jun Aoyama before his death. The single was thus dedicated to the late Aoyama.

== Composition ==
Musically, "Boku wa Pegasus Kimi wa Polaris" is a piano-and-strings-driven pop song written in the key of A-flat major. Misia's vocals span from F_{3} to E♭_{5}. In an interview with Natalie, Misia explains that, when she received the offer to create a song S Saigo no Keikan, she received the directive to make it a "ballad that's also love song". Later, the TV producers changed their demands to "a ballad that's also a love song that's also about friendship". Misia and her producer ended up selecting a demo by Hiroaki Yokoyama. With a common time tempo of 84 beats per minute, the song is not quite a ballad but was slow enough to respect the producers' vision. Once she got approval, Misia then began writing the lyrics for the song. Misia alternated between reading the script over and writing phrases until she completed the lyrics. Misia told Natalie that for the past year, she had been playing with the idea of writing lyrics that could also serve as an allegory. The lyrics to the song depict an epic love story, using metaphorical references to the Pegasus constellation and the guiding star Polaris.

== Critical reception ==
With "Boku wa Pegasus Kimi wa Polaris", Misia was acclaimed for "solidifying her position as a ballad singer". CDjournal critics described the song as a "beautiful ballad" and praised Yokoyama and Misia for the "emotive" melody and for capturing the spirit of the drama series it is featured on.

== Chart performance ==
"Boku wa Pegasus Kimi wa Polaris" debuted at number one and number two on the weekly Mora and Recochoku Singles charts, respectively, making it Misia's highest debut on the digital charts to date. The single debuted at number 26 on the weekly Oricon Singles Chart, with 4,000 copies sold. It charted for seven weeks and sold a reported total of 9,000 copies during its run.

== Track listing ==
No.	Title	Writer(s)	Arranger(s)	Length
1.	"Boku wa Pegasus Kimi wa Polaris" (僕はペガサス 君はポラリス, Boku wa Pegasasu Kimi wa Porarisu, "I Am Pegasus, You Are Polaris")	Misia; Hiroaki Yokoyama	Yokoyama	5:01
2.	"Jewelry"	Mayumi Sato; Geila Zilkha	Her0ism	4:32
3.	"Kimi no Taiyō ni Narō" (君の太陽になろう, "I'll Be Your Sun")	Daisuke Mori	Mori	6:03
Total length:				15:37

Limited edition bonus track
No.	Title	Writer(s)	Arranger(s)	Length
4.	"Koi wa Owaranai Zutto" (Candle Night Live)	Misia; Jun Sasaki	Tohru Shigemi	4:52
Total length:				20:30

== Credits and personnel ==
Personnel

- Vocals – Misia
- Backing vocals – Misia, Hanah Spring
- Songwriting – Misia, Hiroaki Yokoyama
- Arrangement, programming – Hiroaki Yokoyama
- Piano – Tohru Shigemi
- Drums – Fuyu
- Bass – Takeshi Taneda
- Guitar – Shuhei Yamaguchi
- Strings arrangement, conducting – Takayuki Hattori
- Strings group – Gen Ittetsu Strings
- First violin – Gen Ittetsu, Osamu Iyoku, Reina Ushiyama, Nobuko Kaiwa, Cameroun Maki, Kazuha Takahashi, Yayoi Fujita, Tomoshige Yamamoto
- Second violin – Takuya Mori, Yuko Kajitani, Azusa Kawasuso, Kaoru Kuroki, Makiko Tomokiyo, Satoki Nagaoka
- Viola – Daisuke Kadowaki, Tomoko Shimaoka, Chikako Nishimura, Shoko Miki
- Cello – Masami Horisawa, Masayo Inoue, Tomoki Iwanaga, Toshiyuki Muranaka
- Engineering, mixing – Masahiro Kawaguchi
- Mastering – Herb Powers Jr.

== Charts ==
Chart (2014)	Peak position
Japan Weekly Singles (Oricon)	26
Japan Hot 100 (Billboard)	15
Japan Adult Contemporary Airplay (Billboard)	20
Japan Hot Singles Sales (Billboard)	22
Japan Weekly Singles (Recochoku)	2
Japan Yearly Singles (Recochoku)	75
Japan Weekly Singles (Mora)	1
Japan Monthly Singles (Mora)	8
Japan Yearly Singles (Mora)	40

== Certification and sales ==
Region	Certification	Certified units/sales
Japan (RIAJ) Digital	Gold	100,000^{*}
Japan Physical	—	9,000
^{*} Sales figures based on certification alone.
