= Mitsuo Shindō =

Japanese art director (1948–2023)

- Born: 1948; Tokyo, Japan
- Died: 10 February 2023 (aged 74)
- Occupation(s): Art director, film director, music video director

Mitsuo Shindō (信藤 三雄, Shindō Mitsuo, 1948 – 10 February 2023) was a Japanese art director, photographer, film director and producer, music video director and calligraphist.

Shindō designed over 1000 albums and single cover art for artists including Kyary Pamyu Pamyu, Yumi Matsutoya, Pizzicato Five, Mr. Children, Misia, Hikaru Utada and Glay. He was also a frequent collaborator with Mr. Children and Misia, for whom he has directed several music videos.

In 2010, Shindō became a board member of Mudef, a foundation established by Misia and Rhythmedia CEO Hiroto Tanigawa.

Shindō died from stomach cancer on 10 February 2023, at the age of 75.

== Books ==
- CTPP no Design (1996)
- Zoku CTPP no Design Zecchōhen (2002)
- Bonnō Girls Shashinshū (2005)
- Otoko wa Sore o Gaman Dekinai After Hours Taidanshū (2006)
