= Bunkamura =

Concert hall, theater and museum in Shibuya, Tokyo, Japan

Coordinates: 35°39′39″N 139°41′42″E

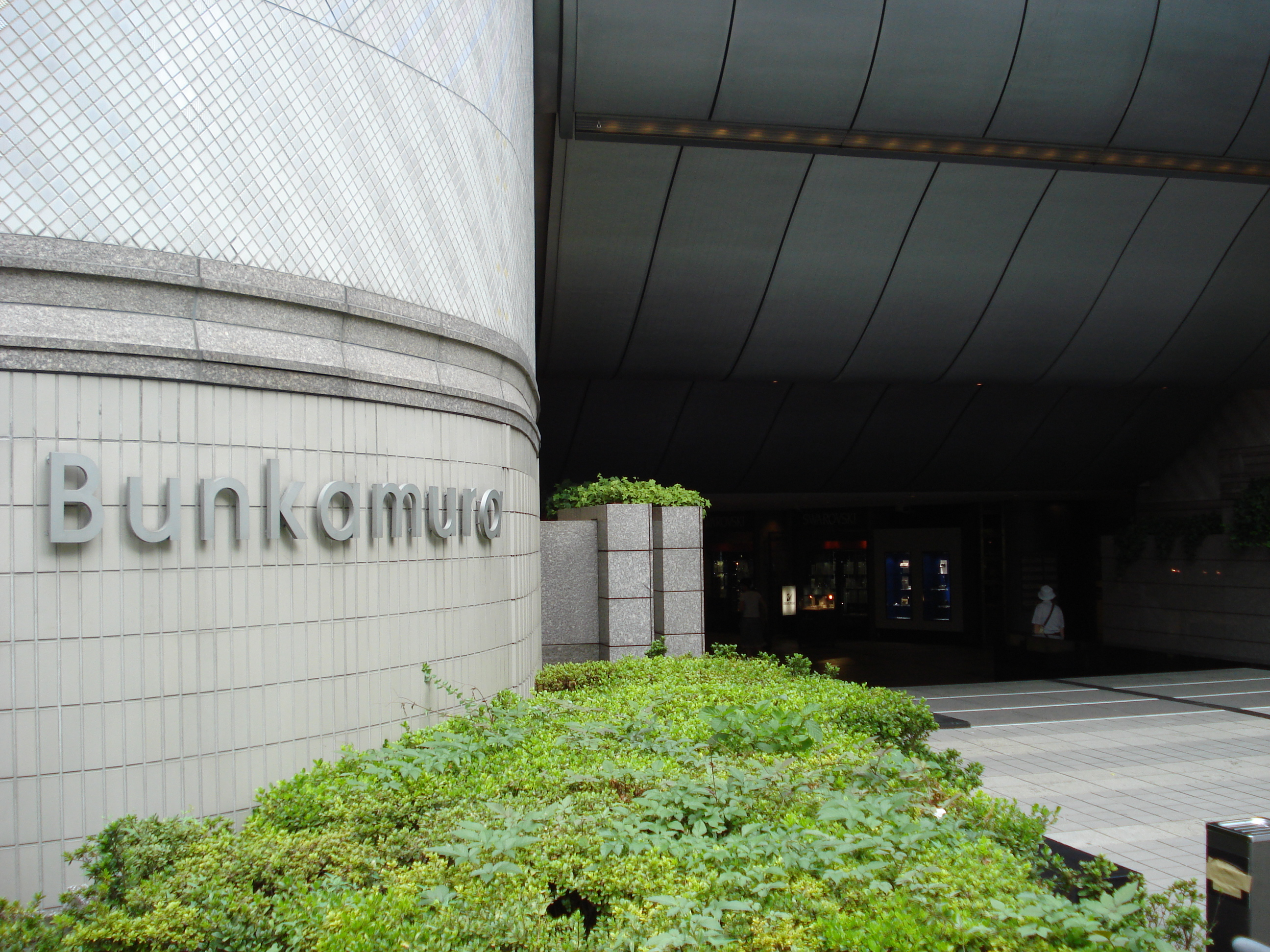
Bunkamura

The Bunkamura (文化村; Japanese for "cultural enclave") is a concert hall, theater and museum located in Shibuya, Tokyo, Japan. Located next to the Tokyu Department Store, it is operated by the Tokyu Bunkamura, Inc. of the Tokyu Group.

Bunkamura opened on September 3, 1989, being the first large-scale cultural complex in Japan when it opened.

A long-term redevelopment process for the local area began on April 10, 2023, with all venues except for the Orchard Hall being closed. During the redevelopment, the company will continue to stage performances in venues across the city.

== Venues ==
The four main venues are:

- Orchard Hall: 2,150 seats
- Theatre Cocoon: 747 seats
- The Museum: changing art exhibits
- Le Cinèma: movie theaters

== See also ==
- Tokyo Philharmonic Orchestra
- Tokyo International Film Festival
