= Orphans no Namida =

Single by Misia

from the album Love Bebop
- Released: 25 November 2015
- Recorded: 23 August 2015
- Studio: Rhythmedia Studio
- Genre: Soul; pop; jazz
- Length: 5:06
- Label: Ariola Japan
- Songwriters: Misia; Shirō Sagisu
- Producer: Shirō Sagisu

Misia singles chronology
"Nagareboshi" / "Anata ni Smile :)" (2015)	"Orphans no Namida" (2015)	"Super Rainbow" (2016)

Music video
- "Orphans no Namida" on YouTube

Audio sample
- "Orphans no Namida": file; help

"Orphans no Namida" (オルフェンズの涙(なみだ), Orufenzu no Namida; lit. "Tears of Orphans") is a song recorded by Japanese singer Misia. It was released on 25 November 2015 by Ariola Japan as the fifth and final single from her twelfth studio album, Love Bebop (2016). Misia wrote the lyrics and Shirō Sagisu composed, arranged and produced the track. "Orphans no Namida" serves as the first ending theme to the 2015 anime series Mobile Suit Gundam: Iron-Blooded Orphans. In commemoration of the 70th postwar broadcast, Misia performed the album version of "Orphans no Namida" at the 66th NHK Kōhaku Uta Gassen, live from the Nagasaki Peace Park.

== Background and release ==
The backing track to "Orphans no Namida" was recorded in June 2014 at Eastcote Studios, London and Sony Music Studios Tokyo, Tokyo. Additionally, the strings were recorded at Abbey Road Studios. The vocals were recorded over a year later on 23 August 2015 at Rhythmedia Studio in Tokyo. Misia first performed the song on the first date of her Misia Candle Night 2015 concert tour, in Fujikawaguchiko on 21 September 2015. On 11 October 2015, the song premiered at the end of the second episode of Mobile Suit Gundam: Iron-Blooded Orphans. The full version premiered on 20 October 2017 on Misia's NHK FM Broadcast radio show Misia: Hoshizora no Radio. "Orphans no Namida" was released for download and as Misia's thirty-second CD single simultaneously on 25 November 2015. The CD single was issued in standard and limited editions, the latter including an exclusive remix of Misia's "Edge of This World". The song "Hana", written by singer-songwriter Rica, was included on the single as a B-side. The standard edition was also released in high-resolution audio throughout digital platforms.

== Composition ==
"Orphans no Namida" was written by Misia and Shirō Sagisu and produced by the latter. The song is a pop ballad with soul and jazz influences, and lyrics descriptive of the series' plot. "Orphans no Namida" is written in the key of B-flat minor and follows a tempo of 76 beats per minute. Misia's vocals span from G♯_{3} to D_{5} in the single version and from G♯_{3} to F♯_{5} in the album version. The album version runs 36 seconds longer than the single version and includes newly recorded ad-libs at the end of the song.

== Chart performance ==
"Orphans no Namida" peaked at number 18 on the Billboard Japan Hot 100 chart. The single debuted at number 23 on both the weekly Oricon Singles Chart, with 6,000 copies sold, and Billboard Top Singles Sales chart. The single charted on the Oricon Singles Chart for ten weeks and sold a reported total of 14,000 copies. On digital outlets, the single entered at the top of the weekly Mora Albums Chart with the high-resolution release and at number 4 with the standard lossy release. The title track itself debuted at number 5 on the weekly Mora Singles Chart and at number 10 on the weekly Recochoku Singles Chart.

== Track listing ==
Standard edition
No.	Title	Writer(s)	Producer(s)	Length
1.	"Orphans no Namida" (オルフェンズの涙, Orufenzu no Namida, "Tears of Orphans")	Misia; Shirō Sagisu	Sagisu	5:06
2.	"Hana" (花, "Flower")	Rica	Tohru Shigemi	4:25
Total length:				9:31

Limited edition
No.	Title	Writer(s)	Producer(s)	Length
3.	"Edge of This World" (Gomi's Feature House Remix)	Misia; Sinkiroh	DJ Gomi	4:59
Total length:				14:33

== Credits and personnel ==
Recording

- Recorded at: Abbey Road Studios and Eastcote Studios, London, United Kingdom, Beethoven Studio, Paris, France, Sony Music Studios Tokyo, Tokyo, Japan and Rhythmedia Studio, Tokyo, Japan; mixed at Rhythmedia Studio in Tokyo, Japan.

Personnel

- Vocals – Misia
- Background vocals – Misia, Lorrain Briscoe, Evette Briscoe, Paul Lee
- Songwriting – Misia, Shirō Sagisu
- Production, arrangement, programming – Shirō Sagisu
- Mixing – Masahiro Kawaguchi
- Mastering – Herb Powers Jr.
- Recording – Shirō Sagisu, Jonathan Allen, Philip Bagenal, George Murphy, Masahiro Kawaguchi
- Drums – Gary Husband
- Rhodes – Mark Walker, Yasuharu Nakanishi
- Acoustic piano – Yasuharu Nakanishi
- Electric guitar – Andrew Smith
- Acoustic guitar – Takayuki Hijikata
- Percussions – Karlos Edwards
- Trumpet – Steve Sidwell
- Tenor Sax – Jamie Talbot
- Baritone Sax – Dave Bishop
- Strings – The London Studio Orchestra
- Conductor – Nick Ingman
- Hammond organ – Mark Walker
- Violin – Perry Montague-Mason, Emlyn Singleton
- Viola – Peter Lale
- Cello – Martin Loveday
- Contrabass – Chris Laurence
- Harp – Skaila Kanga

== Charts ==
Chart (2015)	Peak position	Sales
Japan Weekly Singles (Oricon)	23	14,000
Japan Hot 100 (Billboard)	18	14,000
Japan Hot Animation (Billboard)	6	14,000
Japan Radio Songs (Billboard)	70	14,000
Japan Top Singles Sales (Billboard)	23	14,000

== Release history ==
Region	Date	Format	Label
Japan	21 October 2015	Mainstream radio	Ariola Japan
Japan	25 November 2015	CD single	Ariola Japan
Japan	25 November 2015	Digital download	Ariola Japan
Taiwan	27 November 2015	CD Single	Sony Music Taiwan
