= Her0ism =

Japanese songwriter

her0ism
- Born: Tokyo, Japan
- Genres: Pop, R&B, Rock
- Occupations: Music producer, composer, songwriter
- Label: ever.y inc.
- Website: ever-y.com/heroism

her0ism is a music producer and songwriter, based in Los Angeles, California. Since debuting in 2007, her0ism has sold over 60 million units and received more than 200 #1 records and more than 180 Platinum/Gold Awards globally.

== Career ==
her0ism selected his professional name because he "Can't be a hero in the everyday life, but I thought that I should have been able to be a hero for the person who heard my music". In 2012, her0ism established the creator team named "ever.y".

He co-wrote songs with Alex Geringas, Andreas Carlsson, Andreas Oberg, André "GC" Fennell, Carah Faye, CJ Baran, Damon Sharpe, Erika Nuri, Jared Lee Gosselin, Jimmy Harry, Kurt Schneider, Lindy Robbins, Matthew Gerrard, Marty James, Melanie Fontana, Nash Overstreet, and Stephan Moccio.

He has worked with many top artists in Japan, including NEWS, Misia, Nissy, Juju, Mika Nakashima, Miwa, AKB48, Nogizaka46, Kis-My-Ft2, TVXQ, Koda Kumi, Seiko Matsuda, Chris Hart, Da-iCE, Urashimasakatasen, and Little Glee Monster. In the United States, he has worked with LISA, XG, Austin Mahone, Shahadi Wright Joseph, Paulina Goto, Set It Off, and After Romeo. He has also worked with Cho Yong Pil of Korea, Queensberry of Germany, REDDI of Denmark and Helena Paparizou of Greece.

Lisa's Album "Alter Ego" that includes his song "Dream" reached #1 on Billboards's Top Album Sales. "Midnight", recorded by Set It Off, reached #1 on Billboard's Current Alternative Albums Chart.

== Awards ==
- "Dream" by LISA won Best Pop at 2026 MTV Video Music Awards
- "Yume ga Samete" by Seiko Matsuda and Chris Hart, composed and arranged by her0ism, won the planning prize for the 55th Japan Record Award.
- "Urahara" by JUJU "I", produced, composed, and arranged by her0ism, won the planning prize for the 60th Japan Record Award.

== Selected discography ==
| Region | Released | Format | Song name(s) | Album/DVD/Television Show Title | Artist | Label | Awards/RIAJ Certified |
2 0 2 3
| JPN | 2023.8.9 | Album | "ENTERTAINMENT", "Stranger", "hanami", "IKIRO", "Fullswing", "Endless Summer", "Sakura Girl", "Chankapana", "Beautiful", "Miraihe", "Nagisa no OneeSummer", "NEW STORY", "Tick-Tock" | NEWS EXPO | NEWS | ELOV-Label | Gold Disk(#1 on ORICON weekly chart) |
| JPN | 2023.8.1 | Album | "Suikazura" | Flower | Uratanuki | Uratanuki | |
| JPN | 2023.7.14 | Single | "Rendezvous" | Rendezvous | Nissy | Nissy Entertainment | #1 on iTunes chart |
| JPN | 2023.7.2 | Single | "Karappo" | Karappo | miwa | Sony Music Records | |
| JPN | 2023.5.24 | Album | "CLICK" | Countdown | Girls2 | Sony Music Records | #5 on ORICON weekly chart |
| JPN | 2023.5.17 | DVD | "TRIAD", "Chincha Umakka", "Chankapana", "Miraihe", "LOSER", "Beautiful", "Polyrhythm", "Hashire Melos no youni", "Endless Summer", "Canon", "BURN", "ReBorn", "Topgun", "Coda" | NEWS LIVE TOUR 2022 Ongaku | NEWS | Johnny's Entertainment Record | #1 on ORICON weekly chart |
| JPN | 2023.5.17 | Album | "Hunt" | Departure | ONE N' ONLY | SDR | #6 on ORICON weekly chart |
| TWN | 2023.4.14 | Album | "圈" | 獨角獸 | 艾薇Ivy | Universal Music | |
| JPN | 2023.3.22 | Album | "KNOCK U DOWN" | B9 | Chottokyu | SDR | #2 on ORICON weekly chart |
| JPN | 2023.3.15 | EP | "Tick-Tock", "Hallelujah", "Memories", "Finale" | Ongaku -2nd Movement- | NEWS | Johnny's Entertainment Record | Gold Disk(#1 on ORICON weekly chart) |
| JPN | 2023.2.8 | EP | "Love me", "Ichican Aitaihito" | Valentin ga kotoshimo yattekuru | miwa | Sony Music Records | |
| JPN | 2023.1.25 | Album | "SUPER RAINBOW", "Candle Of Life" | MISIA THE GREAT HOPE BEST | MISIA | Ariola Japan | |
2 0 2 2
| JPN | 2022.9.21 | Album | "Jinsei wahaha" | Fudanjuku 15th Anniversary Best | Fudanjuku | Imperial Records | |
| DEN | 2022.9.8 | Single | "Bad Pop Song" | Bad Pop Song | REDDI | Universal Music | |
| JPN | 2022.8.24 | Single | "Bloom'", "Atarimaeni", "Dive into Summer" | Kimi ni Koishita tokikara | miwa | Sony Music Records | |
| JPN | 2022.8.17 | Album | "TRIAD'", "Polyrhythm", "LOSER", "Canon", "Chincha Umakka", "Beautiful", "BURN", "Miraihe", "Coda", "Hashire Melos no youni", "ReBorn" | ONGAKU | NEWS | Johnny's Entertainment Record | #1 on Oricon chart |
| JPN | 2022.7.27 | Album | "HIKARI" | neon | SparQlew | Kiramune | |
| JPN | 2022.7.6 | Album | "Toni9ht" | MADA | Urashimasakatasen | NBCUniversal Entertainment Japan | #1 on Oricon Albums Chart |
| JPN | 2022.6.15 | Single | "LOSER'", "CANVAS", "TOKYO SUMMER" | LOSER/Sanjushi | NEWS | Johnny's Entertainment Record | #1 on Oricon chart |
| JPN | 2022.6.1 | Single | "Bloom" | Bloom | miwa | Sony Music Records | |
| JPN | 2022.5.24 | Album | "Trippin'", "Say Yes", "Get You Back", "Bokunidekirukoto", "Kimini Fureta Tokikara", "Do Do" | HOCUS POCUS 3 | Nissy | avex trax | #1 on iTunes chart |
| JPN | 2022.4.29 | Album | "Kokoroawase" | Michishirube | Shima | Shima Records | |
| JPN | 2022.3.16 | DVD | "SIGN", "I'll be back 2020" | Da-iCE ARENA TOUR 2021 -SIX- | Da-iCE | avex trax | |
| JPN | 2022.2.23 | Album | "Sparkle", "Aye", "Who I Am" | Sparkle | miwa | Sony Music Records | |
| JPN | 2022.2.9 | DVD | "STORY'", "SUPERSTAR", "TOPGUN", "SEVEN", "IKIRO", "Chankapana", "Kiminokotobaniemiwo", "Silent Love", "Love Story", "STAY ALIVE", "4 Stories MEdley", "NEW STORY" | NEWS Live Tour 2020 Story | NEWS | Johnny's Entertainment Record | #1 on Oricon chart |
| JPN | 2022.2.1 | Album | "Love & Peace" | Best of A.B.C-Z | A.B.C-Z | Pony Canyon | #1 on Oricon Albums Chart |
| JPN | 2022.1.24 | Single | "Kimini Fureta Tokikara" | Kimini Fureta Tokikara | Nissy | avex trax | #1 on iTunes chart |
2 0 2 1
| JPN | 2021.12.15 | Album | "Hashire! Bicycle" | Time Flies | Nogizaka46 | Sony Music Records | Platinum Disk (#1 on Oricon Albums Chart) |
| JPN | 2021.11.17 | Single | "Miraihe", "ReBorn", "Running", "Chiisana Xmas" | Miraihe | NEWS | Johnny's Entertainment Record | Gold Disk, #1 on Oricon Singles Chart |
| JPN | 2021.8.18 | Album | "23 Kaimeno Summer Night" | FAMIEN'21 L.P. | Ebichu | Sony Music Records | |
| CHN | 2021.8.11 | Single | "The Storm Center" | "The Storm Center" | Into1 | Wajijiwa Entertainment | |
| JPN | 2021.8.10 | Album | "Wanna Beeee!!!" | Best of Kis-My-Ft2 | Kis-My-Ft2 | avex trax | |
| JPN | 2021.8.4 | Album | "Love Song" | date. | Uratanuki | Uratanuki | |
| JPN | 2021.7.7 | Album | "Colors" | L∞VE | Urashimasakatasen | NBCUniversal Entertainment Japan | #1 on Oricon Albums Chart |
| JPN | 2021.6.30 | Single | "Burn", "Fly High", "Kamisamani naritaiwakejyanai" | Burn | NEWS | Johnny's Entertainment Record | Gold Disk (#1 on Oricon Singles Chart |
| JPN | 2021.6.18 | Single | "Do Do" | | Nissy | avex trax | |
| JPN | 2021.3.28 | Album | "Shinuhodosuki" | Shibuhodosuki | WHITE JAM | | |
| JPN | 2021.3.17 | Album | "Missing you" | 8 Infinity | SOLIDEMO | avex trax | |
| JPN | 2021.1.27 | Album | "Michi" | BOYMEN the Universe | Boys and Men | Universal Music Japan | #3 on Oricon Albums Chart |
| JPN | 2021.1.27 | Album | "Kimitonara" | Chaosix | Nobuhiko Okamoto | Lantis | |
| JPN | 2021.1.20 | Album | "Close to You", "Harmony" | GRADATI∞N | Little Glee Monster | Sony Music Records | #3 on Oricon Albums Chart |
| JPN | 2021.1.20 | Album | "I'll Be Back in 2020" | SiX | Da-iCE | avex trax | #4 on Oricon Albums Chart |
2 0 2 0
| JPN | 2020.12.23 | Single | "Beautiful", "Changes", "Chinchaumakka", "Endless Summer" | Beautiful / Chinchaumakka / Canary | NEWS | Johnny's Entertainment Record | Gold Disk, #1 on Oricon Singles Chart |
| JPN | 2020.11.25 | Album | "Rainbow", "Get Up" | Rainbow | Urashimasakatasen | NBCUniversal Entertainment Japan | #3 on Oricon Albums Chart |
| JPN | 2020.11.4 | Album | "Sky" | Life is... | Irino Miyu | Bandai Namco Arts | |
| JPN | 2020.10.21 | DVD | "WORLDISTA'", "Going that way", "Sakura Girl", "Koiwoshiranai Kimihe", "Santanoinai Xmas", "Strawberry", "IKIRO", "EMMA", "Love Story", "TOPGUN", "SPIRIT", "WORLD QUEST" | NEWS Live Tour 2019 Worldista | NEWS | Johnny's Entertainment Record | Gold Disk, #1 on Oricon chart |
| JP | 2020.9.9 | Album | "Who I Am" | Daitan! | miwa | Sony Music Records | |
| JP | 2020.8.21 | EP | "23 Kaimeno Summer Night" | FAMIEN'20 e.p. | Ebichu | Sony Music Records | |
| JP | 2020.8.12 | Album | "Hello to Dream" | Clearly | Yuka Iguchi | Warner Home Video | |
| JP | 2020.6.24 | Single | "Bokunidekirukoto" | | Nissy | Avex Trax | |
| US/JPN | 2020.6.19 | Single | "Wallpaper" | | Shahadi Wright Joseph | Universal Music Japan | |
| JPN | 2020.4.8 | Album | "Your Story" | Kimigatsuitausonara | JUJU | Sony Music Records | Gold Disk, #1 on Oricon Albums Chart |
| JPN | 2020.3.20 | Single | "Who I Am" | | miwa | Sony Music Records | |
| JPN | 2020.3.4 | Album | | Story | NEWS | Johnny's Entertainment | Gold Disk, #1 on Oricon Albums Chart |
| MEX | 2020.3.1 | Single | "Golpe Avisa" | | Paulina Goto | Cosmos Records | |
| JPN | 2020.2.19 | Album | "Still Love You" | AAA 15th Anniversary All Time Best - Thanx AAA Lot | AAA | avex trax | Gold Disk, #1 on Oricon Albums Chart |
| JPN | 2020.1.22 | DVD | | NEWS Dome Tour 2018-2019 Epcotia Encore | NEWS | Johnny's Entertainment | Gold Disk, #1 on Oricon chart |
2 0 1 9
| US | 2019.10.25 | TV | "True Original" | Equestria Girls | | Hasbro | |
| JPN | 2019.9.17 | Single | "In the Future" / "Heat Beat" | | Hi☆Five | Kino Music | #2 on Oricon Singles Chart |
| JPN | 2019.9.11 | DVD | | NEWS 15th Anniversary Live 2018 Strawberry | NEWS | Johnny's Entertainment | Gold Disk, #1 on Oricon chart |
| JPN | 2019.9.4 | DVD | "Shiroikisetsu" | Life is Going On and On | MISIA | Ariola Japan | |
| JPN | 2019.8.14 | Single | "Natsunoyume" | | SNUPER | Kiss Entertainment | #3 on Oricon Singles Chart |
| JPN | 2019.8.14 | Single | "Hana" | | Naoto Ini Raymi | Universal Music Japan | |
| JPN | 2019.8.1 | Album | "Here We Are" | Unlimited | Uratanuki | NBCUniversal Entertainment Japan | |
| JPN | 2019.7.17 | Single | "Hello to Dream" | | Yuka Iguchi | Warner Home Video | |
| JPN | 2019.6.26 | Album | "$HUFFLE" | Roulette | Urashimasakatasen | NBCUniversal Entertainment Japan | Gold Disk, #2 on Oricon Albums Chart |
| JPN | 2019.6.21 | Single | "Hana" | | Naoto Inti Raymi | Universal Music Japan | |
| JPN | 2019.6.12 | Single | "Topgun" / "Love Story" | | NEWS | Johnny's Entertainment | Gold Disk, #1 on Oricon Singles Chart |
| JPN | 2019.6.6 | Album | "Sora", "Lost Love", "Sign" | Da-iCE Best | Da-ice | Universal Music Japan | #2 on Oricon Albums Chart |
| JPN | 2019.4.24 | Album | "Trickstar" | Welcome to the Trickstar Night | Ensemble Stars! | Frontier Works | #5 on Oricon Albums Chart |
| JPN | 2019.2.20 | Album | | Worldista | NEWS | Johnny's Entertainment | Gold Disk, #1 on Oricon Albums Chart |
| JPN | 2019.2.4 | Album | "ワガママ" | Nissy Entertainment 5th Anniversary Best | Nissy | avex trax | Gold Disk, #1 on Oricon Albums Chart |
| USA | 2019.2.1 | Album | "Different Songs" | Midnight | Set It Off | Fearless Records | #1 Current Alternative Albums |
| JPN | 2019.1.16 | Album | "Close to You" | Flava | Little Glee Monster | Sony Music Records | #1 on Oricon Albums Chart |
| JPN | 2019.1.16 | DVD | | NEWS Arena Tour 2018 Epcotia | NEWS | Johnny's Entertainment | Gold Disk, #1 on Oricon chart |
2 0 1 8
| JPN | 2018.12.26 | Album | "Super Rainbow" | Life Is Going On and On | MISIA | Ariola Japan | #5 on Oricon Albums Chart |
| JPN | 2018.12.24 | DVD | | Nissy Entertainment 2nd Live Final in Tokyo Dome | Nissy | avex trax | Gold Disk, #1 on Oricon chart |
| USA | 2018.12.10 | TV | "Yoko" | Teem Mom OG | Mikey Wax | MTV | |
| JPN | 2018.12.5 | Album | "B e l ! e v e r", "Update", "Yume No Melody", "Smile for Tomorrow" | B e l ! e v e r | MAG!C☆PRINCE | Universal Music Japan | #3 on Oricon Albums Chart |
| KOR | 2018.11.13 | Album | "The Last Day" | 3rd Mini Album 'I' | Fly to the Sky | H2MEDIA | |
| JPN | 2018.9.12 | Single | "Strawberry" | | NEWS | Johnny's Entertainment | Platinum Disk, #1 on Oricon Singles Chart |
| JPN | 2018.7.11 | Album | "Acoustic Story", "We Are the Light" | Acoustic Story | miwa | Sony Music Records | |
| JPN | 2018.6.27 | Single | "Blue" | | NEWS | Johnny's Entertainment | Gold Disk, #1 on Oricon Singles Chart |
| JPN | 2018.3.21 | Album | | Epcotia | NEWS | Johnny's Entertainment | Gold Disk, #1 on Oricon Albums Chart |
| JPN | 2018.3.14 | Single | "Close to You" | | Little Glee Monster | Sony Music Records | #6 on Oricon Singles Chart |
| JPN | 2018.1.24 | DVD | | NEWS Live Tour 2017 Neverland | NEWS | Johnny's Entertainment | Gold Disk, #1 on Oricon chart |
| JPN | 2018.1.24 | Single | "Urahara" | | JUJU | Sony Music Records | |
| JPN | 2018.1.17 | Single | "LPS" / "Newsical" | | NEWS | Johnny's Entertainment | Gold Disk, #1 on Oricon Singles Chart |
2 0 1 7
| JPN | 2017.11.1 | DVD | "Update", "Compass" | Live at Zepp Tokyo | MAG!C☆PRINCE | Universal Music Japan | |
| JPN | 2017.10.25 | Single | "We Are the Light" | | miwa | Sony Music Records | #10 on Oricon Singles Chart |
| JPN | 2017.10.25 | Album | "One More Thing" | Fine Collection - Begin Again | TVXQ | avex trax | Gold Disk, #1 on Oricon Albums Chart |
| JPN | 2017.10.18 | Album | "Perfect Beauty" | Dirty Work – The Album | Austin Mahone | Universal Music Japan | #7 on Oricon Albums Chart |
| JPN | 2017.10.18 | Single | "Yume No Melody" | | MAG!C☆PRINCE | Universal Music Japan | #2 on Oricon Singles Chart |
| JPN | 2017.10.4 | Album | "Yumenokoe" | Identity | Sayaka Yamamoto | laugh out loud records | #2 on Oricon Albums Chart |
| JPN | 2017.10.4 | Album | "Yumegasamete" | こころのうた | Chris Hart | Universal Sigma | |
| JPN | 2017.9.27 | Album | "Jinseiwahaha" | All Time Best | Fudanjyuku | インペリアルレコード | |
| JPN | 2017.9.20 | Single | "Perfect Beauty" | | Austin Mahone | Universal Music Japan | |
| JPN | 2017.6.21 | Album | "Mr. Dream" | 5 Performer-Z | A.B.C-Z | Pony Canyon | #2 on Oricon Albums Chart |
| JPN | 2017.6.14 | DVD | "Fight Back, "Sora", "I'll Be Back" | Da-iCE Phase 5 Final | Da-iCE | Universal Music Japan | |
| JPN | 2017.5.24 | DVD | "Ashitahamottosukininaru", "Shiroikisetsu", "Super Rainbow", "Candle of Life" | The Tour of Misa Love Bebop | MISIA | Ariola Japan | |
| JPN | 2017.5.3 | Single | "Update" | | MAG!C☆PRINCE | Universal Music Japan | #2 on Oricon Singles Chart |
| JPN | 2017.3.22 | Album | | Neverland | NEWS | Johnny's Entertainment | Gold Disk, #1 on Oricon Albums Chart |
| EUR | 2017.1.18 | Single | "How Did We Get Here" | | State of Mind | Universal Music Japan | |
2 0 1 6
| JPN | 2016.12.14 | DVD | "Chankapana", "Sakura Girl" | NEWS Live Tour 2016 Quartetto | NEWS | Johnny's Entertainment | Gold Disk, #1 on Oricon chart |
| JPN | 2016.12.12 | Album | "I'll Be Back" | Da-iCE Indies Collection | Da-iCE | Universal Sigma | |
| JPN | 2016.11.2 | Single | "Yes or No" | | Da-iCE | Universal Sigma | #3 on Oricon Singles Chart |
| JPN | 2016.10.5 | Album | "Valentine", "Usotsuki", "Boys & Girls", "Sakanaide", "Tokiyotomare", "Natsunante", "I MISS YOU" | White Jam Best | WHITE JAM | Universal Sigma | |
| JPN | 2016.7.22 | Single | "Super Rainbow" | | MISIA | Ariola Japan | |
| JPN | 2016.7.13 | Single | "Koiwoshiranaikimihe" / "Smile" | | NEWS | Johnny's Entertainment | Gold Disk, #1 on Oricon Singles Chart |
| JPN | 2016.6.29 | Album | "Dreamer" | Ying Yang | Cross Gene | Universal J | |
| JPN | 2016.4.20 | DVD | | NEWS Live Tour 2015 White | NEWS | Johnny's Entertainment | Gold Disk, #1 on Oricon chart |
| JPN | 2016.4.6 | Single | "Watch Out "/ "Sora" | | Da-iCE | Universal Sigma | #3 on Oricon Singles Chart |
| JPN | 2016.3.24 | Album | "Wagamama" | Hocus Pocus | Nissy | avex trax | #1 on iTunes chart in Japan |
| JPN | 2016.1.27 | Album | "Dreamer" | YAMA-P | Tomohisa Yamashita | Warner Music Japan | #1 on Oricon Albums Chart |
| JPN | 2016.1.20 | DVD | "Wanna Beeee!!!" | 2015 Concert Tour Kis-My-World | Kis-My-Ft2 | avex trax | Platinum Disk, #1 on Oricon chart |
| JPN | 2016.1.20 | Album | "Dance in the Rain" | Winter of Love | Kumi Koda | Rhythm Zone | |
| JPN | 2016.1.6 | Album | "Candle of Love", "Shiroikisetsu", "Sakurahitohira", "Ashitahamottosukininaru" | Love Bebop | MISIA | Ariola Japan | |
| JPN | 2016.1.6 | Album | "Harmony" | Colorful Monster | Little Glee Monster | Gr8! Records | |
2 0 1 5
| JPN | 2015.12.30 | Album | "Voice" | Fixer | Akina Nakamori | Universal J | |
| JPN | 2015.12.23 | DVD | "Mukuchinalion", "Hashire！Bicycle" | All MV Collection | Nogizaka46 | Sony Music Records | Gold Disk, #1 on Oricon chart |
| JPN | 2015.12.9 | Album | "Kimigatsuitausonara" | What You Want | JUJU | Sony Music Records | Gold Disk |
| JPN | 2015.12.9 | Album | "Yumegasamete" | We Love Seiko | Seiko Matsuda | Universal Sigma | Gold Disk, #3 on Oricon Albums Chart |
| JPN | 2015.9.23 | Single | "Harmony" | | Little Glee Monster | Gr8! Records | |
| JPN | 2015.9.16 | Album | "Still Love You" | 10th Anniversary Best | AAA | avex trax | Gold Disk, #1 on Oricon Albums Chart |
| JPN | 2015.8.19 | Album | "Sense of Happiness", "Flashback Time", "Ready to Love", "Sakihokore" | Smooth & Groove | Anri | IVY Records | |
| JPN | 2015.7.1 | Album | "Wanna Beeee!!!" | Kis-My-World | Kis-My-Ft2 | avex trax | Platinum Disk, #1 on Oricon Albums Chart |
| JPN | 2015.4.1 | Album | "Tokyo 2 LA" | The Story Continues... | After Romeo | Sony Music Records | |
| JPN | 2015.2.18 | Single | "Candle of Life" | | MISIA | Ariola Japan | |
2 0 1 4
| JPN | 2014.10.15 | Album | "Fight Back", "Lost Love" | Fight Back | Da-iCE | Universal Sigma | #3 on Oricon Albums Chart |
| JPN | 2014.6.11 | Single | "World Quest" | | NEWS | Johnny's Entertainment | Gold Disk, #1 on Oricon Singles Chart |
| JPN | 2014.4.16 | Single | "Sign" | | Da-iCE | Universal Sigma | #5 on Oricon Singles Chart |
| EUR | 2014.3.26 | Album | "One Life" | One Life | Elena Paparizou | Lionheart Music Group | #3 on the IFPI charts in Greece |
| JPN | 2014.3.19 | DVD | "Chankapana", "Nagisano OneeSummer", "Pocoponpecorya", "WORLD QUEST", "Fullswing", "HIGHER GROUND", "Sakura GIrl" | NEWS 10th Anniversary in Tokyo Dome | NEWS | Johnny's Entertainment | #1 on Oricon chart |
| JPN | 2014.3.19 | DVD | "French Kiss" | Kara 2nd Japan Tour 2013 Karasia | KARA | Universal Sigma | |
| JPN | 2014.3.16 | Album | "Harmony" | Little Glee Monster | Little Glee Monster | Sanbafree | |
| JPN | 2014.3.12 | Album | "Love & Peace" | From ABC to Z | A.B.C-Z | Pony Canyon | #4 on Oricon Albums Chart |
| JPN | 2014.2.26 | Single | "Take It Back" | | MBLAQ | IVY Records | |
| JPN | 2014.1.29 | DVD | "Wanna Beeee!!!", "Give Me...", "Keep on Smile" | Snow Down in Tokyo Dome 2013.11.16 | Kis-My-Ft2 | avex trax | Gold Disk, #1 on Oricon chart |
2 0 1 3
| JPN | 2013.7.17 | Album | "Chankapana", "Nagisano OneeSummer", "Pocoponpecorya", "WORLD QUEST", "Fullswing", "HIGHER GROUND" | NEWS | NEWS | Johnny's Entertainment | Gold Disk, #1 on Oricon Albums Chart |
| GRC | 2013.7.3 | Album | "Mesimeria (One Life)" | Ti Ora Tha Vgoume? | Helena Paparizou | EMI Music Greece | #1 on the IFPI charts in Greece |
| JPN | 2013.6.12 | Single | "Evolution No. 9" | | 9nine | SME Records | |
| JPN | 2013.6.5 | Single | "I'll Be Back" | | Da-iCE | Octave | |
| KOR | 2013.4.23 | Album | "When I Am With You" | Hello | Cho Yong-pil | Universal Music Japan | Double Platinum Disk, Golden Disk Awards, Seoul Music Awards, Bonsang Award, Record of the Year |
| JPN | 2013.3.27 | Single | "Kiss Your Mind" "S.O.S. (Smile on Smile" | | Kis-My-Ft2 | Avex Trax | Platinum Disk, #1 on Oricon Singles Chart |
| JPN | 2013.3.27 | Album | "Wanna Beee!!!", "Give Me..." | Good | Kis-My-Ft2 | Avex Trax | Platinum Disk, #1 on Oricon Albums Chart |
| JPN | 2013.2.13 | DVD | "Still Love You" | AAA Tour 2012 777 ～ Triple Seven | AAA | Avex Trax | #1 on Oricon chart |
| JPN | 2013.1.30 | DVD | "Chankapana", "Starry", "Fullswing", "Sakura Girl", "Endless Summer" | NEWS Live Tour 2012 | NEWS | Johnny's Entertainment | #1 on Oricon chart |
2 0 1 2
| JPN | 2012.12.26 | Single | "Himitsu" | Say!Ippai | Erena Ono | Warner Music Japan | |
| JPN | 2012.11.21 | Album | "Sky High" | Timeless Future | Cross Gene | Universal J | |
| JPN | 2012.11.7 | Album | "Wonderful Life" | BEST STORY～Life stories～ | JUJU | Sony Music Records | #1 on Oricon Singles Chart |
| JPN | 2012.10.31 | Single | "Tonight's the Night" | | Romeo | Victor Entertainment | |
| JPN | 2012.9.12 | Single | "Bokura ~Love&Peace~" | Zutto Love | A.B.C-Z | Pony Canyon | #1 on Oricon Singles Chart |
| JPN | 2012.8.22 | Single | "Hashire！Bicycle" | "Hashire！Bicycle" | Nogizaka46 | Sony Music Records | Platinum Disk, #1 on Oricon Singles Chart |
| JPN | 2012.8.22 | Album | "Still Love You" | 777 ～Triple Seven | AAA | avex trax | #2 on Oricon Albums Chart |
| JPN | 2012.8.22 | Album | "Akirerukurai bokuraha negaou" | 17 | Tokio | J Storm | #5 on Oricon Albums Chart |
| JPN | 2012.8.15 | Single | "WANNA BEEEE!!!" | WANNA BEEEE!!!/Shake It Up | Kis-My-Ft2 | avex trax | Platinum Disk, #1 on Oricon Singles Chart |
| JPN | 2012.8.1 | Single | "Laugh Laugh Taisou" | YELL ~Kagayakutamenomono ~/Laugg Laugh Taisou | Sataandagi | Pony Canyon | |
| KOR | 2012.7.25 | Album | "Mayday! Mayday!" | Only One | BoA | SM Entertainment | |
| JPN | 2012.7.18 | Single | "Chankapana", "Fullswing", "Starry" | Chankapana | NEWS | Johnny's Entertainment | Platinum Disk, #1 on Oricon Singles Chart |
| JPN | 2012.6.27 | Album | "Sky High" | Timeless Begins | Cross Gene | Universal J | |
| DEU | 2012.6.22 | Album | "Superboy Should" | Chapter 3 | Queensberry | Warner Music | |
| JPN | 2012.6.13 | Album | "Sakura Girl", "Endless Summer", "FLY AGAIN", "Forever" | NEWS BEST | NEWS | Johnny's Entertainment | Platinum Disk, #1 on Oricon Singles Chart |
| JPN | 2012.5.16 | Single | "Still Love You" | Still Love You | AAA | Avex Trax | #3 on Oricon Singles Chart |
| JPN | 2012.5.9 | Album | "Be..." | HEART | Ms.OOJA | Universal Sigma | #4 on Oricon chart |
| JPN | 2012.4.25 | DVD | "Sakura Girl", "Bokuranosora", "Hanabi", "Hanamuke" | Tegomassnomahou | Tegomass | Johnny's Entertainment | #1 on Oricon chart |
| JPN | 2012.3.21 | Single | "Stargazer" | Lost the Way | DiVA | avex trax | #3 on Oricon Singles Chart |
| JPN | 2012.3.14 | Single | "One More Thing" | STILL | TVXQ | avex trax | |
| JPN | 2012.3.14 | Single | "Takaramono" | Takaramono | Sataandagi | Pony Canyon | |
| ZAF | 2012.3.1 | Albun | "Liefde is" | Heuning | Heuning | | |
| JPN | 2012.2.29 | Single | "Be..." | Be... | Ms.OOJA | Universal Sigma | Million Download |
| JPN | 2012.2.29 | DVD | "Life" | Mika Nakashima Concert Tour 2011 The Only Star | Mika Nakashima | Sony Music Records | |
2 0 1 1
| JPN | 2011.12.28 | DVD | | AKB48 Yossha~Ikuzo~! in Seibu Dome | AKB48 | King Records | #1 on Oricon chart |
| JPN | 2011.11.21 | DVD | "Dreamer", "World is yours" | TOMOHISA YAMASHITA ASIA TOUR 2011 SUPER GOOD SUPER BAD | Tomohisa Yamashita | Johnny's Entertainment | Gold Disk, #1 on Oricon chart |
| JPN | 2011.11.16 | Album | "Ganbare", "I Can", "HEART OF GOLD" | change | Honey L Days | avex trax | |
| JPN | 2011.10.26 | Album | "Nippondanji", "POSITION", "Kagerou", "HIROZ ~Samurai Road~", "Kibou", "Tokimeki", "Sasarasara" | Samurai Road | HIROZ SEVEN+ | HATS UNLIMITED | |
| JPN | 2011.10.19 | Album | "Hanabi" | Tegomassnomahou | Tegomass | Johnny's Entertainment | #1 on Oricon chart |
| JPN | 2011.9.28 | Album | "That LOVE", "Good bye Good day", "love again? feat. DOHZI-T" | That LOVE | Maria | NAYUTAWAVE RECORDS | |
| JPN | 2011.9.14 | Single | "I Can" | I Can | Honey L Days | avex trax | |
| JPN | 2011.7.28 | Single | "Miracle Love" | Second Lady | Mai Oshima | avex trax | |
| DEU | 2011.7.20 | TV | "Friday Night" | TV Feature Movie "DIE ERFINDERBRAUT" | | | |
| JPN | 2011.7.13 | Single | "NEVER GIVE UP!" | NEVER GIVE UP! | Kylee | DefSTAR Records | |
| JPN | 2011.6.8 | Album | "Bokunidekirukoto" | Kokoniitakoto | AKB48 | King Records | Million Disk, #1 on Oricon Albums Chart |
| JPN | 2011.6.1 | Single | "Ganbare" | Ganbare | Honey L Days | avex trax | |
| JPN | 2010.5.11 | Album | "Bokuranosora", "Yoruhahoshiwo nagameteokure", "Hanamuke", "Moshimokonosekaikara 〇〇ganakunattara", "Minnagairusekaiwohitotsuni aiwomotto Give&Take shimasho" | Tegomass 2nd Live Tegomass no Ai | Tegomass | Johnny's Entertainment | #1 on Oricon Albums Chart |
| JPN | 2011.4.17 | Single | "Yumenokanatahe" | Yumenokanatahe | Aoi | Tokuma Japan | |
| JPN | 2011.1.26 | Single | "Good bye Good day" | Good bye Good day | Maria | NAYUTAWAVE RECORDS | |
2 0 1 0
| JPN | 2010.12.29 | Single | "Kimigatooi" | Kimigatooi | anju | Universal J | |
| JPN | 2010.12.22 | DVD | | NEWS Dome Party 2010 Live! Live! Live! DVD! | NEWS | Johnny's Entertainment | Gold Disk, #1 on Oricon chart |
| JPM | 2010.11.24 | Single | "Believe" | My Only Dream / Believe | Honey L Days | avex trax | |
| JPN | 2010.11.24 | Single | "youth" | Surrender love | Aoi from Ayabieru | Tokuma Japan | |
| JPN | 2010.11.3 | Single | "Wake Up" | Fighting Man | NEWS | Johnny's Entertainment | Gold Disk, #1 on Oricon Singles Chart |
| JPN | 2010.10.20 | Single | "eye love you ~Romance~" feat. HAKUEI from PENICILLIN | eye love you ~Romance~ | anju | Universal J | |
| JPN | 2010.9.22 | Album | "Days" | Niji | Yui Aragaki | Warner Music Japan | |
| JPN | 2010.9.15 | Album | "Akinosora", "Wonderland", "Sakura Girl". "Endless Summer" | Live | NEWS | Johnny's Entertainment | Gold Disk, #1 on Oricon Albums Chart |
| JPN | 2010.7.28 | Single | "flavor favor for you", "World is yours" | One in a million | Tomohisa Yamashita | Johnny's Entertainment | Platinum Disk, #1 on Oricon Singles Chart |
| JPN | 2010.5.26 | Single | "Manazashi" | Manazashi | Honey L Days | avex trax | Million Download |
| JPN | 2010.4.28 | Single | "Stargazer" | Stargazer | Yuka Masuda | Media Factory | |
| JPN | 2010.4.21 | Album | "Bokuranosora", "Yoruhahoshiwo nagameteokure" | Tegomass no Ai | Tegomass | Johnny's Entertainment | Gold Disk, #1 on Oricon Albums Chart |
| JPN | 2010.3.31 | Single | "Sakura Girl" | Sakura Girl | NEWS | Johnny's Entertainment | Platinum Disk, #1 on Oricon Singles Chart |
〜 2 0 0 9
| JPN | 2009.11.18 | Single | "After the Rain" | Loveless | Tomohisa Yamashita | Johnny's Entertainment | |
| JPN | 2009.11.4 | DVD | "Forever", "Fly Again" | NEWS Live Diamond | NEWS | Johnny's Entertainment | Gold Disk, #1 on Oricon chart |
| JPN | 2009.7.8 | Single | "Hanamuke" | Tanabatamatsuri | Tegomass | Johnny's Entertainment | |
| JPN | 2009.3.25 | Album | "Life", "Wonderful Life" | Title ha LIFE desu | Various Artists | Sony Music Records | |
| JPN | 2008.11.26 | Single | "I can be free" | Sunaoninaretara/I can be gree | JUJU | Sony Music Records | Gold Disk, #6 on Oricon Singles Chart |
| JPN | 2008.11.19 | Album | "Forever", "Give & Take", "Fly Again" | Color | NEWS | Johnny's Entertainment | Platinum Disk, #1 on Oricon Albums Chart |
| JPN | 2008.9.3 | Single | "Akirerukurai Bokuraha negaou" | Amagasa/Akirerukurai Bokuraha negaou" | Tokio | J Storm | #2 on Oricon Singles Chart |
| JPN | 2007.12.19 | Single | "Still Lovin' You" | HIKARI | Sowelu | DefSTAR Records | |
| JPN | 2007.11.21 | Album | "Namidanokanata", "Hikarisasubasho" | Gateway to Tomorrow | Miyu Nagase | CAM ENTERTAINMENT | |
| JPN | 2007.10.24 | Single | "Ikiwo Kasanemashou", "Shousetsu no nakano futari" | Ikiwo Kasanemashou | Natsumi Abe | hachama | |
| JPN | 2007.10.10 | Album | Wonderful Life | Wonderful Life | JUJU | Sony Music Records | |
| JPN | 2007.8.22 | Single | "LIFE" | LIFE | Mika Nakashima | Sony Music Records | Gold Disk, #1 on Oricon chart 1.8 million Download |
| JPN | 2007.4.25 | Single | "HEART & SOUL" | HEART & SOUL | Mai Kariyuki | Media Factory | |
