= Misia discography =

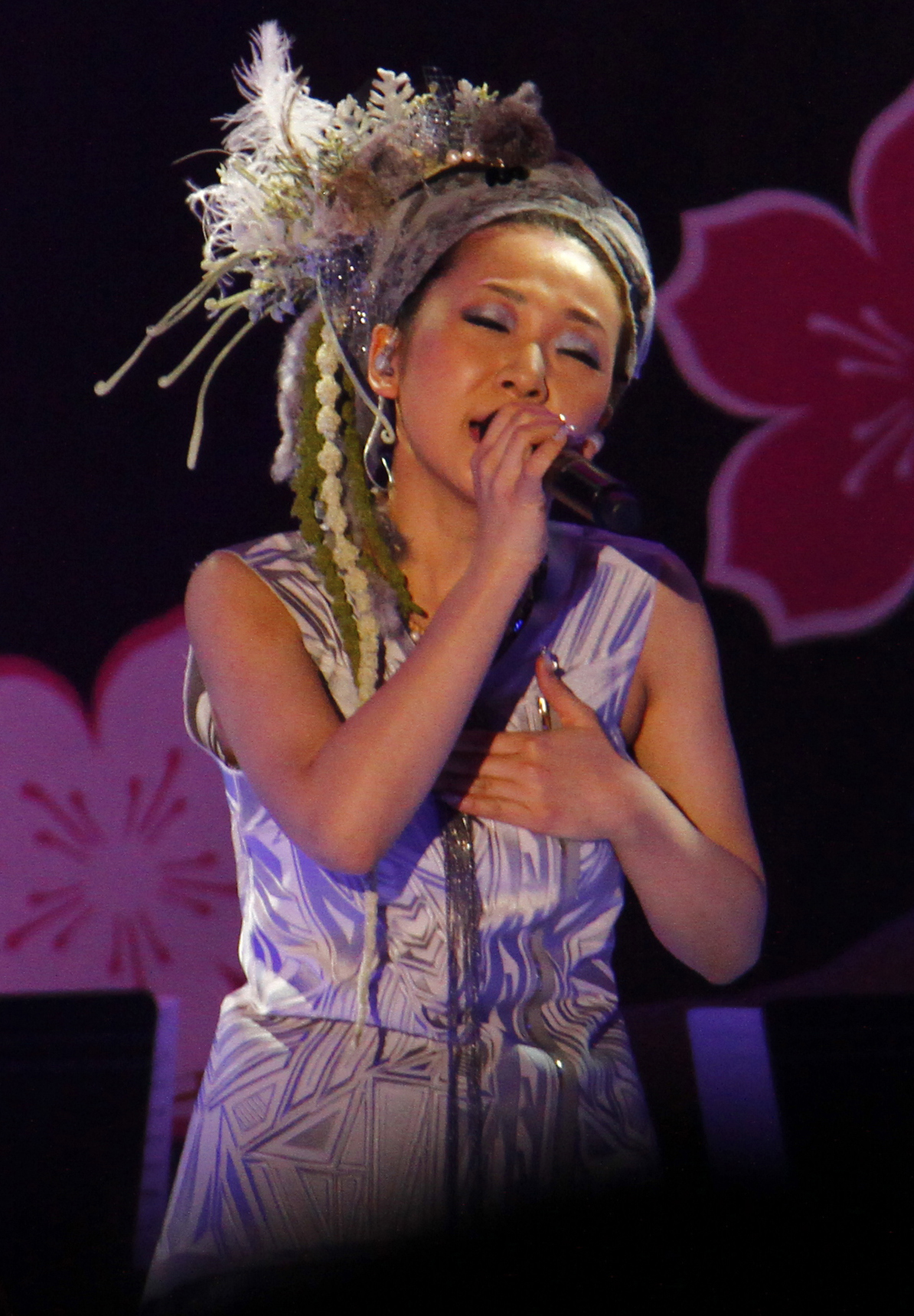
- Misia performing at the Centennial National Cherry Blossom Festival, 2012
- Studio albums: 15
- Extended plays: 1
- Live albums: 2
- Compilation albums: 4
- Singles: 62
- Video albums: 20
- Cover albums: 1
- Remix albums: 6

The discography of Japanese R&B singer Misia consists of fifteen studio albums, three compilation albums, one extended play (EP), one live album, six remix albums, twenty-six singles (including one as a featured artist), twelve promotional singles, eighteen video albums and thirty-seven music videos. In 1997, Misia signed a recording contract with BMG Japan and joined the then up-and-coming talent agency, Rhythmedia. Under the sub-label Arista Japan, Misia released her first single, "Tsutsumikomu Yō ni..." in February 1998, followed by "Hi no Ataru Basho" in May. In June, her debut album, Mother Father Brother Sister, opened at number three on the Oricon chart. The album peaked at number one three weeks later and stayed in the top five for eleven consecutive weeks. Mother Father Brother Sister was certified double million and won a Japan Record Award for Best Album, as well as a Japan Gold Disc Award for Pop Album of the Year. In 2000, Misia's second studio album, Love Is the Message, debuted at number one and was certified double million. It won a Japan Record Award for Best Album and a Japan Gold Disc Award for Pop Album of the Year. The album spawned three top ten hits: "Believe," "Wasurenai Hibi" and "Sweetness." Misia's first remix album, Misia Remix 2000 Little Tokyo, was released three months later and shot to number one. It sold over 800,000 copies and is the second best-selling remix album of all time in Japan.

In October 2000, Misia released "Everything." The single debuted atop the Oricon chart, becoming Misia's first number one hit. "Everything" is Misia's most successful single: it won a Japan Gold Disc Award for Song of the Year and, with 1.9 million copies sold in Japan alone, it is the fourth best-selling single of all time by a female artist and the best-selling single of the decade by a female artist. Misia's third studio album, Marvelous, was released in 2001. In addition to "Everything", the album produced two more top ten singles: "Escape" and "I Miss You (Toki o Koete)," Misia's collaboration song with Dreams Come True. The album was certified million and was the second best-selling studio album of the year. It won a Japan Gold Disc Award for Pop Album of the Year. In October 2001, Misia and Rhythmedia parted ways with BMG and partnered with Avex to form their own label, Rhythmedia Tribe. In March 2002, BMG released Misia's first compilation album, Misia Greatest Hits. The album spent two consecutive weeks at number one and sold over 1.9 million copies, becoming the thirtieth best-selling compilation album of all time in Japan, as well as the fourth best-selling album of the year. The compilation album won a Japan Gold Disc Award for Pop Album of the Year and is Misia's third release to be certified double million. Six months later, Misia released her fourth studio album, Kiss in the Sky, which also debuted atop of the Oricon chart, tying Misia with Namie Amuro and Mai Kuraki as the fourth female artist with the longest streak of number one albums since their debut, behind BoA, Hikaru Utada and Ayumi Hamasaki. The album stayed two weeks at number one and was certified million It won a Japan Gold Disc Award for Pop Album of the Year. Kiss in the Sky yielded three singles: "Hatenaku Tsuzuku Story," Misia's first release under Rhythmedia Tribe, "Nemurenu Yoru wa Kimi no Sei," her second number one single, and "Back Blocks," her first recut single. Misia was the third highest-selling act of 2002.

In 2004, Misia released two albums that both peaked at number three and reached platinum certification: her fifth studio album, Mars & Roses, and the concept album, Singer for Singer. Three years later, she released her seventh and last studio album under the Avex partnership, Ascension, which peaked at number two on the Oricon chart and was certified gold. Later that year, Misia signed back with former record label BMG Japan and released her seventeenth single, "Any Love," which became her first top ten hit in three years. In 2008, Misia released her eighth studio album, Eighth World, which was certified gold. In 2009, Misia released her ninth and first studio album to feature mainly ballads, Just Ballade. It debuted at number four and was certified gold. Its lead single, "Aitakute Ima," was chosen as theme song for the anticipated TV drama, Jin, and peaked at number nine on the Oricon chart, making it Misia's first top ten hit since "Royal Chocolate Flush" in 2007. The song has sold over one million downloads since its release and was certified triple platinum in download sales. As a result of its popularity with viewers and critics alike, it won the Television Drama Academy Award for Best Drama Song. Misia's tenth studio album, Soul Quest, was released on July 27, 2011. Its only physical single, "Kioku," was released on May 25, 2011.

== Studio albums ==
List of albums, with selected chart positions
Title	Album details	Peak positions			Sales (JPN)	Certifications
Title	Album details	JPN	KOR Overseas (Note: The Gaon Albums Chart was established in 2010.) (Note: Week references for Gaon: Just Ballade, Soul Quest, New Morning,)	TWN East Asian (Note: Position was taken from sources as follows: Ascension 2007 week 10, 2007 Ascension 2007 week 39, Eighth World 2008 week 2, "Yes Forever" 2008 week 18, Decimo 2008 week 35, "Catch the Rainbow" 2008 week 51, "Ginga/Itsumademo" and Discotheque Asia 2009 week 24, Just Ballade 2009 week 51, Yozora no Live V 2010 week 25, "Kioku", Soul Search 2011 week 33, Misia no Mori 2012 week 28, New Morning 2014 week 20, "Shiroi Kisetsu/Sakura Hitohira",)	Sales (JPN)	Certifications
Mother Father Brother Sister	Released: June 24, 1998; Label: Arista Japan; Formats: CD, cassette, hybrid CD, digital download	1	—	—	2,580,000	RIAJ: 2× Million
Love Is the Message	Released: January 1, 2000; Label: Arista; Formats: CD, cassette, hybrid CD, digital download	1	—	—	2,298,000	RIAJ: 2× Million
Marvelous	Released: April 25, 2001; Label: Arista; Formats: CD, cassette, hybrid CD, digital download	1	—	—	1,638,000	RIAJ: 2× Million
Kiss in the Sky	Released: September 26, 2002; Label: Rhythmedia Tribe; Formats: CD, 2CD, cassette, hybrid CD, digital download	1	—	—	863,000	RIAJ: Million
Mars & Roses	Released: February 11, 2004; Label: Rhythmedia; Formats: CD, cassette, digital download	3	—	—	250,000	RIAJ: Platinum
Singer for Singer	Released: December 8, 2004; Label: Rhythmedia; Formats: CD, cassette, digital download	3	—	—	370,000	RIAJ: Platinum
Ascension	Released: February 7, 2007; Label: Rhythmedia; Formats: CD, CD/DVD, digital download	2	—	10	128,000	RIAJ: Gold
Eighth World	Released: January 9, 2008; Label: BMG Japan; Formats: CD, CD/DVD, digital download	3	—	4	132,000	RIAJ: Gold
Just Ballade	Released: December 16, 2009; Label: Ariola Japan; Formats: CD, Blu-spec CD/DVD, digital download	4	53	5	143,000	RIAJ: Gold
Soul Quest	Released: July 27, 2011; Label: Ariola; Formats: CD, 2CD, digital download	7	12	18	40,000	
New Morning	Released: April 2, 2014; Label: Ariola; Formats: CD, digital download	7	34	15	33,000	
Love Bebop	Released: January 6, 2016; Label: Ariola; Formats: CD, digital download	5	—	—	27,000	
Life Is Going On and On	Released: December 26, 2018; Label: Ariola; Formats: CD, digital download, streaming	5	—	—	76,000 (Note: Combined sales figures for Life Is Going On and On: 71,644 (physical sales) + 4,741 (digital sales).)	
Hello Love	Released: December 1, 2021; Label: Ariola; Formats: CD, digital download, streaming	5	—	—	39,000	
Love Never Dies	Released: May 28, 2025; Label: Ariola; Formats: CD, digital download, streaming	5	—	—	15,942	
"—" denotes items released before the creation of the G-Music or Gaon charts, or failed to chart.

== Cover albums ==
List of albums, with selected chart positions
Title	Album details	Peak positions		Sales (JPN)
Title	Album details	JPN	TWN East Asian	Sales (JPN)
Misia no Mori: Forest Covers	Released: December 14, 2011; Label: Ariola; Formats: CD, digital download	10	13	29,000

== Extended plays ==
List of albums, with selected chart positions
Title	Album details	Peak positions	Sales (JPN)	Certifications
Title	Album details	JPN	Sales (JPN)	Certifications
The Glory Day	Released: November 21, 1998; Label: Arista; Formats: CD, LP, cassette, hybrid CD, digital download	6	748,000	RIAJ: 2× Platinum
Misia Soul Jazz Session	Released: July 26, 2017; Label: Ariola; Formats: Blu-spec CD2, digital download	11	15,000 (Note: Combined sales figures for Misia Soul Jazz Session: 13,996 (physical sales) + 1,732 (digital sales).)	

== Compilation albums ==
List of albums, with selected chart positions
Title	Album details	Peak positions			Sales (JPN)	Certifications
Title	Album details	JPN	TWN (Note: The G-Music chart was established in July 2005 and only archives the top 20 releases.)	TWN East Asian (Note: Positions was taken from 2007 week 38 for 2007 Asia Super Best Album.)	Sales (JPN)	Certifications
Misia Greatest Hits	Released: March 3, 2002; Label: Arista; Formats: CD, hybrid CD, digital download	1	—	—	1,852,000	RIAJ: 2× Million
Misia Single Collection: 5th Anniversary	Released: December 3, 2003; Label: BMG Japan; Formats: CD, hybrid CD, cassette, digital download	8	—	—	139,000	RIAJ: Platinum
Misia Love & Ballads: The Best Ballade Collection	Released: June 16, 2004; Label: BMG Japan; Formats: CD, cassette, digital download	1	9 (Note: 2007 Chinese re-release titled 2007 Asia Super Best Album.)	1	175,000	RIAJ: Platinum
Super Best Records: 15th Celebration	Released: February 20, 2013; Label: Ariola Japan; Formats: 3-Blu-spec CD2, digital download	1	—	—	216,000 (Note: Combined sales figures for Super Best Records: 15th Celebration: 196,751 (physical sales) + 19,412 (digital sales).)	RIAJ: Platinum
Misia Soul Jazz Best 2020	Released: January 22, 2020; Label: Ariola Japan; Formats: CD, digital download, streaming, LP	3	—	—	92,000 (Note: Combined sales figures for Misia Soul Jazz Best 2020: 83,801 (physical sales) + 8,069 (digital sales).)	RIAJ: Gold
So Special Christmas	Released: November 18, 2020; Label: Ariola Japan; Formats: CD, digital download, streaming	7	—	—	22,000 (Note: Combined sales figures for So Special Christmas: 21,092 (physical sales) + 1,164 (digital sales).)	
"—" denotes items which were released before charts were created, not released in that country or failed to chart.

== Live album ==
List of albums, with selected chart positions
Title	Album details	Peak positions	Sales (JPN)	Certifications
Title	Album details	JPN	Sales (JPN)	Certifications
Hoshizora no Live: The Best of Acoustic Ballade	Released: October 22, 2003; Label: Rhythmedia; Formats: CD, hybrid CD, cassette, digital download	2	210,000	RIAJ: Platinum
Misia Hoshizora no Live Song Book: History of Hoshizora Live	Released: March 9, 2016; Label: Ariola; Formats: 2CD, digital download	10	7,000	

== Remix albums ==
List of albums, with selected chart positions
Title	Album details	Peak positions			Sales (JPN)	Certifications
Title	Album details	JPN	TWN (Note: The G-Music chart was established in July 2005 and only archives the top 20 releases.)	TWN East Asian	Sales (JPN)	Certifications
Misia Remix 1999	Remix extended play; Released: June 9, 1999; Label: Arista Japan; Formats: LP, cassette	36	—	—	14,000	
Misia Remix 2000 Little Tokyo	Released: April 19, 2000; Label: Arista; Formats: 2CD, cassette	1	—	—	831,000	RIAJ: 2× Platinum
Misia Remix 2002 World Peace	Released: November 21, 2001; Label: Arista Japan; Formats: 2CD, cassette	3	—	—	332,000	RIAJ: Platinum
Misia Remix 2003 Kiss in the Sky: Non Stop Mix	Released: April 23, 2003; Label: Rhythmedia; Formats: 2CD, cassette, digital download	3	—	—	84,000	RIAJ: Gold
Decimo X Anniversario de Misia	Released: June 25, 2008; Label: BMG; Formats: CD/DVD, digital download	15	16	3	20,000	
Misia The DJ Remixes Complete Box	Released: June 25, 2008; Label: BMG; Formats: Digital download	—	—	—		
"—" denotes items which were released before charts were created, not released in that country or failed to chart.

== Singles ==
=== As a lead artist ===
List of singles, with selected chart positions
Title	Year	Peak chart positions			Sales (JPN)	Certifications	Album
Title	Year	Oricon Singles Chart	Billboard Japan Hot 100 (Note: The Japan Hot 100 was established in February 2008.) (Note: Sources for chart positions are as follows: "Royal Chocolate Flush", "Yes Forever", "Yakusoku no Tsubasa", "Catch the Rainbow", "Ginga", "Aitakute Ima", "Hoshi no Yō ni", "Kioku", "Koi wa Owaranai Zutto", "Deepness", "Back in Love Again", "Shiawase o Forever", "Boku wa Pegasus Kimi wa Polaris", "Shiroi Kisetsu", "Orphans no Namida", "Love Never Dies", "Last Dance Anatato", "Sayonara Bakka".)	TWN East Asian	Sales (JPN)	Certifications	Album
"Tsutsumikomu Yō ni..."	1998	11 (Note: Position for 8cm single. 12cm edition reached number 20.)	32 (Note: 15th Anniversary Version, charted in 2013.)	—	678,000	RIAJ (physical): Platinum; RIAJ (cellphone): Gold	Mother Father Brother Sister
"Hi no Ataru Basho"	1998	9	—	—	233,000		Mother Father Brother Sister
"Believe"	1999	2 (Note: Position for 12cm single. 8cm edition reached number 23.)	—	—	347,000	RIAJ (physical): Platinum	Love Is the Message
"Wasurenai Hibi"	1999	3	—	—	403,000	RIAJ (physical): Platinum	Love Is the Message
"Sweetness"	1999	7	—	—	226,000	RIAJ (physical): Gold	Love Is the Message
"Escape"	2000	7	—	—	258,000	RIAJ (physical): Gold	Marvelous
"Everything"	2000	1 (Note: Preceding vinyl edition charted at number 60, Junior+Gomi Remix vinyl charted at 39.)	— (Note: Charted at number 26 on the Adult Alternative Airplay chart in 2008, Hex Hector's Club Mix charted at number 73 in 2014.)	—	1,885,730	RIAJ (physical): Million (Note: "Everything" originally received a 3× Platinum certification for 1,200,000 copies, however the 3× Platinum threshold was changed to 750,000 copies in 2003.); RIAJ (download): 2× Platinum; RIAJ (streaming): Platinum	Marvelous
"I Miss You (Toki o Koete)" (with DCT)	2001	3	—	—	432,000	RIAJ (physical): Platinum	Marvelous
"Hatenaku Tsuzuku Story"	2002	3	—	—	181,000	RIAJ (physical): Platinum	Kiss in the Sky
"Nemurenu Yoru wa Kimi no Sei"	2002	1	—	—	322,000	RIAJ (physical): Platinum; RIAJ (download): Gold	Kiss in the Sky
"Back Blocks"	2002	7	—	—	64,000	RIAJ (physical): Gold	Kiss in the Sky
"Kokoro Hitotsu"	2003	7	—	—	70,000	RIAJ (physical): Gold	Mars & Roses
"In My Soul"	2003	7	—	—	49,000	RIAJ (physical): Gold	Mars & Roses
"Snow Song"	2003	7	—	—	49,000	RIAJ (physical): Gold	Mars & Roses
"Namae no Nai Sora o Miagete"	2004	9	—	—	58,000	RIAJ (physical): Gold	Singer for Singer
"Luv Parade"	2006	16	—	—	24,000		Ascension
"Color of Life"	2006	16	—	—	24,000		Ascension
"Sea of Dreams"	2006	13	—	—	31,000		Ascension
"Any Love"	2007	8	—	—	23,000		Eighth World
"Royal Chocolate Flush"	2007	10	56 (Note: Peaked before the creation of the Billboard Japan Hot 100.)	—	20,000		Eighth World
"Yes Forever"	2008	15	4	19	11,000		Just Ballade
"Yakusoku no Tsubasa"	2008	12	4	—	13,000		Just Ballade
"Catch the Rainbow"	2008	11	2	14	12,000		Non-album single
"Ginga"	2009	15	9	13	10,000		Just Ballade
"Itsumademo"	2009	15	—	13	10,000		Just Ballade
"Aitakute Ima"	2009	9	3	—	47,000	RIAJ (download): Million; RIAJ (ringtone): 2× Platinum; RIAJ (streaming): Platinum	Just Ballade
"Hoshi no Yō ni..."	2009	18	8	—	6,000		Just Ballade
"Kioku"	2011	21	22	16	8,000		Soul Quest
"Koi wa Owaranai Zutto"	2012	17	16	—	11,000		Super Best Records
"Deepness"	2012	15	10	—	12,000		Super Best Records
"Back in Love Again" (featuring Tomoyasu Hotei)	2012	18	12	—	7,000		Super Best Records
"Shiawase o Forever"	2013	26	23	—	5,000		New Morning
"Boku wa Pegasus Kimi wa Polaris"	2014	26	15	—	9,000	RIAJ (download): Gold	New Morning
"Shiroi Kisetsu"	2015	24	34	6	9,000		Love Bebop
"Sakura Hitohira"	2015	24	—	6	9,000		Love Bebop
"Nagareboshi"	2015	— (Note: As a digital single, it was ineligible to chart on Oricon or G-Music charts.)	—	—			Love Bebop
"Anata ni Smile :)"	2015	—	— (Note: Charted at number 81 on the Hot Radio Songs sub-chart.)	—			Love Bebop
"Orphans no Namida"	2015	23	18	—	14,000	RIAJ (download): Gold	Love Bebop
"Kimi no Soba ni Iru yo"	2017	37	21	—	3,000		Life Is Going On and On
"Ai no Katachi" (featuring Hide (GReeeeN))	2018	15	4	—	67,000	RIAJ (download): 3× Platinum; RIAJ (streaming): 2× Platinum	Life Is Going On and On
"Love Never Dies"	2025	—	75	—			Love Never Dies
"Last Dance Anatato"	2026	—	5	—			TBA
"Sayonara Bakka"	2026	—	92	—			TBA
"—" denotes items which were released before charts were created, not released in that country or failed to chart.

=== As a featured artist ===
Title	Year	Peak chart positions		Album
Title	Year	Oricon Singles Charts	Billboard Japan Hot 100 (Note: Sources for chart positions are as follows: "Flying Easy Loving Crazy.")	Album
"Flying Easy Loving Crazy" (Toshinobu Kubota featuring Misia)	2008	18	26	Timeless Fly

=== Promotional singles ===
List of singles, with selected chart positions, showing year released and album name.
Title	Year	Peak chart positions		Certifications	Album
Title	Year	Oricon Singles Charts	Billboard Japan Hot 100 (Note: Sources for chart positions are as follows: "Taiyo no Chizu", "To Be in Love", "Kimi wa Sogen ni Nekoronde", "Sukoshi Zutsu Taisetsu ni", "Edge of this World", "Maware Maware", "This Is Me", "Smile", "Hope & Dreams", "Butterfly Butterfly".)	Certifications	Album
"Kiss Shite Dakishimete" (キスして抱きしめて; "Kiss and Hold Me")	1998	—	—	RIAJ (download): Gold	Mother Father Brother Sister
"Key of Love (Ai no Yukue)" (愛の行方; "Love's Whereabouts")	1998	—	—		The Glory Day
"The Glory Day"	1998	64 (Note: 1999 remix EP position.)	—		The Glory Day
"Into the Light"	1998	—	— (Note: 15th Anniversary Version charted at number 85 on the Adult Alternative Airplay chart in 2013.)		The Glory Day
"Atsui Namida" (アツイナミダ; "Hot Tears")	2000	—	—		Love Is the Message
"Sweet Pain"	2000	—	—		Misia Remix 2000 Little Tokyo
"Rhythm Reflection"	2001	—	—		Marvelous
"Toki o Tomete" (時をとめて; "Stop Time")	2001	—	—		Misia Remix 2002
"Close to My Heart (Ano Natsu no Mama de)" (あの夏のままで; "Just as It Was That Summer")	2001	—	—		Misia Remix 2002
"Sunny Day"	2001	—	—		Misia Remix 2002
"Don't Stop Music!"	2002	—	—		Kiss in the Sky
"Always"	2003	172	—		Misia Remix 2003
"Destiny's Rule"	2003	—	—		Misia Remix 2003
"Mekubase no Blues" (めくばせのブルース; "Winking Blues")	2003	—	—		Misia Remix 2003
"Over Bit"	2003	—	—		Misia Remix 2003
"Taiyō ga Iru Kara" (太陽がいるから; "Because There's the Sun")	2003	—	—		Misia Remix 2003
"Groovin'"	2004	—	—		Mars & Roses
"Tobikata o Wasureta Chiisa na Tori (Star Ocean Version)" (飛び方を忘れた小さな鳥; "A Small Bird Who Forgot to Fly") (Note: Originally released on Kiss in the Sky Kanzenban.)	2004	—	—		Misia Love & Ballads
"Hoshizora no Katasumi de" (星空の片隅で; "In a Corner of the Starry Sky") (Misia x Fumiya Fujii)	2004	—	—		Singer for Singer
"Song for You"	2005	—	—		Ascension
"Shinin' (Nijiiro no Rhythm)"	2005	—	—		Ascension
"Future Funk"	2007	—	—		Ascension
"Soba ni Ite" (そばにいて...; "Stay by My Side")	2007	—	—	RIAJ (download): Gold	Eighth World
"Taiyō no Chizu" (太陽の地図; "Map of the Sun")	2008	—	38		Eighth World
"To Be in Love"	2008	—	32		Eighth World
"Kimi wa Sōgen ni Nekoronde" (君は草原に寝ころんで; "You're Lying in a Field")	2008	—	74		Eighth World
"Sukoshi Zutsu, Taisetsu ni"	2009	—	42		Just Ballade
"Edge of This World"	2010	—	48		Soul Quest
"Maware Maware" (with M2J and Francis Jocky)	2010	—	55		Listen Up! The Official 2010 FIFA World Cup Album / Soul Quest
"Life in Harmony"	2010	—	— (Note: Charted at number 57 on the Adult Alternative Airplay chart.)		David Foster Presents Love, Again / Soul Quest
"Ashita e"	2011	—	—		Soul Quest
"This Is Me"	2011	—	67		Soul Quest
"Smile"	2011	—	41		Misia no Mori
"Holiday"	2013	—	— (Note: Charted at number 51 on the Adult Alternative Airplay chart.)		Super Best Records
"Hope & Dreams"	2014	—	97		New Morning
"Butterfly Butterfly"	2016	—	65		Love Bebop
"Super Rainbow"	2016	—	—		Life Is Going On and On
"—" denotes items which were released before charts were created or failed to chart.

== Video albums ==
=== Live concerts ===
List of media, with selected chart positions
Title	Album details	Peak positions	
Title	Album details	JPN	TWN
WM	Released: April 1, 1999; Label: Arista; Formats: VHS	—	—
Love Is the Message: The Tour of Misia 1999-2000	Released: July 26, 2000; Label: Arista; Formats: DVD, VHS	6	—
The Tour of Misia 2001	Released: May 20, 2001; Label: Arista; Formats: DVD, VHS	3	—
The Tour of Misia 2002	Released: March 27, 2002; Label: Rhythmedia; Formats: DVD	4	—
The Tour of Misia 2003: Kiss in the Sky in Sapporo Dome	Released: March 26, 2003; Label: Rhythmedia; Formats: DVD	8	—
The Tour of Misia 2004: Mars & Roses	Released: March 31, 2004; Label: Rhythmedia; Formats: DVD	5 (Note: December 2004 re-release also charted at number 128.)	—
Hoshizora no Live II: Acoustic Live in Okinawa	Released: March 31, 2004; Label: Rhythmedia; Formats: DVD	9	—
The Singer Show: The Tour of Misia 2005	Released: July 7, 2005; Label: Rhythmedia; Formats: DVD/CD, DVD	12	—
Hoshizora no Live III: Music Is a Joy Forever	Released: December 12, 2006; Label: Rhythmedia; Formats: DVD	12	—
Hoshizora no Live Star Package: II & III	Released: December 12, 2006; Label: Rhythmedia Tribe; Formats: 2DVD	12	—
The Tour of Misia 2007: Ascension	Released: July 4, 2007; Label: BMG; Formats: Blu-ray, DVD	7	14
Hoshizora no Live IV: Classics + Film of Misia in Kibera Slum	Released: December 5, 2007; Label: BMG Japan; Formats: DVD/CD, DVD	14	—
The Tour of Misia 2008: Eighth World (Note: Standard version packaged with Decimo X.)	Released: June 25, 2008; Label: BMG/Ariola; Formats: Blu-ray, DVD	—	—
The Tour of Misia: Discotheque Asia	Released: June 10, 2009; Label: Ariola; Formats: Blu-ray, 2DVD, DVD	4	6
Hoshizora no Live V Just Ballade: Misia with Hoshizora no Orchestra 2010	Released: May 26, 2010; Label: Ariola; Formats: DVD/CD, DVD	11	7
Hoshizora no Live VI Encore 2010: International Year of Biodiversity	Released: October 20, 2010; Label: Ariola; Formats: Blu-ray, DVD/CD, DVD	12	—
The Tour of Misia Japan Soul Quest: Grand Finale 2012 in Yokohama Arena	Released: June 20, 2012; Label: Ariola; Formats: Blu-ray, 2DVD	17	—
The Tour of Misia Japan Soul Quest: Grand Finale 2012 in Yokohama Arena	Released: June 20, 2012; Label: Ariola; Formats: Blu-ray, 2DVD	17	—
The Tour of Misia Box Blu-ray 15th Celebration	Released: February 20, 2013; Label: Ariola; Formats: 11Blu-ray	20	—
Hoshizora no Live VII: 15th Celebration Hoshizora Symphony Orchestra	Released: July 2, 2014; Label: Ariola; Formats: Blu-ray, DVD, 2DVD	22	—
Sekai Isan Gekijo Misia Candle Night at Okinawa	Released: April 1, 2015; Label: Ariola; Formats: DVD+Blu-ray	15 (Note: Charted at number 8 on the Music DVD chart)	—
The Tour of Misia Love Bebop: All Roads Lead to You (Yokohama Arena Final)	Released: May 24, 2017; Label: Ariola; Formats: Blu-ray/CD, DVD/CD	16 (Note: Charted at number 20 on the Blu-ray chart)	—
"—" denotes items which were released before charts were created, not released in that country or failed to chart.

=== Music video collections ===
List of media, with selected chart positions
Title	Album details	Peak positions
Title	Album details	JPN
Collection: Music Clips Since 1998	Released: July 7, 2001; Label: Arista Japan; Formats: DVD, VHS	6
Misia My Music Video Awards	Released: September 8, 2004; Label: Rhythmedia Tribe; Formats: DVD	8

== Music videos ==
Year	Title	Director(s)
1998	"Tsutsumikomu Yō ni..."	Ukon Kamimura
1998	"Hi no Ataru Basho"	Ukon Kamimura
1998	"Key of Love (Ai no Yukue)"	Mitsuhiro "S" Iizuka
1999	"Believe"	Ukon Kamimura
1999	"Wasurenai Hibi"	Ukon Kamimura
1999	"Sweetness"	Ukon Kamimura
2000	"Escape"	Ukon Kamimura
2000	"Everything"	Ukon Kamimura
2001	"I Miss You (Toki o Koete)" (with DCT)	Mitsuhiro "S" Iizuka
2001	"Rhythm Reflection"	Kōki Tange
2002	"Hatenaku Tsuzuku Story"	Mitsuhiro "S" Iizuka
2002	"Nemurenu Yoru wa Kimi no Sei"	Noriyuki Tanaka
2002	"Don't Stop Music!"	Kōki Tange
2002	"Back Blocks"	Ukon Kamimura
2003	"Kokoro Hitotsu"	Hiroto Tanigawa
2003	"In My Soul"	Kōki Tange
2003	"Snow Song"	Ukon Kamimura
2004	"Namae no Nai Sora o Miagete"	Noriyuki Tanaka
2004	"Holy Hold Me"	Yasuo Inoue
2006	"Luv Parade"	Ukon Kamimura
2007	"Angel"	Mitsuhiro "S" Iizuka
2007	"Any Love"	Mitsuo Shindō
2007	"Royal Chocolate Flush"	Hiroto Tanigawa
2008	"Yes Forever"	Ukon Kamimura
2008	"Flying Easy Loving Crazy" (Toshinobu Kubota featuring Misia)	Kensuke Kawamura
2008	"Yakusoku no Tsubasa"	Tomoo Noda
2008	"Catch the Rainbow"	Mitsuo Shindō
2008	"Catch the Rainbow" (Live Version)	Mitsuhiro "S" Iizuka
2009	"Ginga"	Ukon Kamimura
2009	"Aitakute Ima"	Noriyuki Tanaka
2009	"Hoshi no Yō ni..."	Tomoo Noda
2009	"Baobab no Ki no Shita de"	Mitsuo Shindō
2010	"Edge of This World"	Mitsuhiro "S" Iizuka
2010	"Aitakute Ima" (Live Version)	Mitsuhiro "S" Iizuka
2010	"Everything" (Live Version)	Mitsuhiro "S" Iizuka
2010	"Maware Maware" (featuring M2J and Francis Jocky)	Ukon Kamimura
2011	"Kioku"	Electronik
2011	"This Is Me"	Electronik
2011	"Smile"	Shinichi "Sam" Kawase
2012	"Koi wa Owaranai Zutto"	Mitsuo Shindō
2012	"Deepness"	Sayaka Nakane
2012	"Back In Love Again" (Misia featuring Tomoyasu Hotei)	Mitsuo Shindō, Sayaka Nakane
2013	"Holiday"	Ellie Omiya
2013	"Shiawase o Forever"	Ellie Omiya
2014	"Boku wa Pegasus Kimi wa Polaris"	Ukon Kamimura
2014	"Boku wa Pegasus Kimi wa Polaris" (Live Version)	Muneyoshi Nowara
2014	"Hope & Dreams" (Live Version)	Muneyoshi Nowara
2015	"Shiroi Kisetsu"	Mao Muramatsu
2015	"Orphans no Namida"	Yasuhiro Arafune
2015	"Orphans no Namida" (Live Version)	Shin'ichi Kawase
2016	"Butterfly Butterfly"	Sayaka Nakane
2017	"Kimi no Soba ni Iru yo"	Fumihiko Sori
2018	"Ai no Katachi"	Ukon Kamimura
2020	"Suitotto"	Sayaka Nakane
2020	"Without say goodbye"	
2021	"Higher Love"	Hideaki Sunaga
2023	"Kizudarake no Ouja" (with Rockon Social Club)	
2024	"Fleur de la Passion"	Masakazu Fukatsu
2025	"Love Never Dies"	Tsubasa Matsumoto
2026	"Last Dance With You"	Sayaka Nakane

== Other appearances ==
List of non-studio album or guest appearances that feature Misia.
Title	Year	Album	Notes
"Yume no Soko" (夢の底; "Bottom of a Dream") (Kyōko Koizumi)	1998	Kyo	Featured in chorus.
"The Best of Time"	2003	Slow Jam: Sweet Ballade Collection	
"Indigo Waltz (Live Version)"	2003	Slow Jam: Sweet Ballade Collection	Toshinobu Kubota cover, recorded at Sapporo Dome on December 31, 2002.
"Survivor" (Ganga Zumba featuring Misia)	2006	Habatake!	
"Sea of Dreams (Gomi's Lair Club Mix)"	2007	Disneymania presents Pop Parade Japan	
"Hoshi no Yō ni... (Gomi's Ultra Legend Club Mix)"	2009	Mega Monster Battle: Ultra Galaxy Soundtrack	
