= This Is Me (Misia song) =

Promotional single by Misia

from the album Soul Quest
- Released: July 13, 2011
- Studio: RMT Studio; Beethoven Studio; Eastcote Studios; Air Studios
- Genre: Disco; rock
- Length: 3:56
- Label: Ariola Japan
- Songwriter(s): Misia; Mike Wyzgowski; Shirō Sagisu
- Producer(s): Shirō Sagisu; Elliot James

Audio sample
- "This Is Me": file; help

"This Is Me" (stylized as "THIS IS ME") is a song recorded by Japanese singer Misia for her tenth studio album Soul Quest. It was released digitally as a promotional single by Ariola Japan on July 13, 2011.

== Release ==
On June 26, 2011, the first snippet of the song was released through Misia's official website. "This Is Me" was released digitally in truetone format on July 3, 2011. It was then made available as an iTunes Store-exclusive pre-order bonus for Soul Quest.

== Composition ==
"This Is Me" was co-written by Misia and Mike Wyzgowski and composed by Shirō Sagisu, who produced and arranged the track with Elliot James. The song was written in January 2011, right before Misia embarked on her nationwide concert tour The Tour of Misia Japan Soul Quest. The song became the tour's main theme as well as being the leading track for Soul Quest. Misia received a demo by Sagisu with a note that read "disco masterpiece for Misia". Misia, who has collaborated with Sagisu on many songs over the years, described the song as "groovy and fast-paced" and "nothing like he's ever done before." She remarked that it sounded like it could have been recorded in the '80s. Misia was inspired by Sagisu, whom she describes as someone who "marches to the beat of his own drum" and "makes the most of the canvas he is given" to pen lyrics about the "real me".

== Music video ==
=== Background and development ===
The music video for "This Is Me" was directed by Electrotnik, a directing duo composed of Hiroshi Nakane and Sayaka Nakane, who previously directed the music video for "Kioku" (2011). The video features CG and traditional animation. It depicts Misia and various characters, including flower dancers, anthropomorphic dogs and lions and a caped dancer portrayed by Misia's tour dancers and members of the dance group Vanilla Grotesque, in an alternative fairyland. Electrotnik explained that they took a "stylish approach" for the video, noting that, at the time, they had predominantly worked with male hip hop artists and saw working with Misia as a welcome challenge. Misia praised the duo's work as "fantastic" and expressed enjoyment at working with her tour dancers on the project. The video was styled by Toshio Takeda and features the camera and lighting work of Naoki Noda. It premiered on Misia's thirty-third birthday, July 7, 2011, on the official Soul Quest website, and was first televised on July 11, 2011, on Space Shower TV.

=== Synopsis ===
Misia with her arms outstretched to the sky, surrounded by the other fairytale characters.

The intro to the video depicts the caped dancer confronting a witch, depicted in traditional animation, during which "Soul Quest Overture" from Soul Quest is played. After vanquishing the witch, the caped dancer turns Misia and her dog back to their human forms and frees them from the cage in which they were trapped in. Misia is seen wearing a layered white dress with a belt and a head-wrap adorned in gold while her hair is styled in an afro. The trio dance their way out of the witch's castle as Misia restores it back to its pristine state through magic. On their way out, the caped dancer finds the witch's two servant crows and returns them back to their human forms as they join Misia outside. As Misia wanders out of the castle into a forest, five flower dancers emerge from the ground and engage in a dance routine. Misia then gives the statue of a lion in the middle of the forest human form. As the second chorus kicks in, Misia is seen resting on large rock, singing, while the flower dancers surround her. As the chorus ends, the camera quickly pans to the sky where the lion man, who has now duplicated himself, is gesturing while standing on a cloud. The flower dancers end their routine by holding hands and jumping, bending their bodies in unison. As they move away from each other, a horse magically springs from the ground. The video ends with Misia and the supporting fairytale characters dancing and singing before a large sun covered with clouds on which the two horses and five flower dancers appear to be standing. The last sequence features Misia, who is surrounded by a radiant halo of light, and the other characters standing still as they outstretch their arms and raise their heads to the sky.

== Chart performance ==
"This Is Me" charted at number 67 on the Billboard Japan Hot 100.

== Credits and personnel ==
Personnel

- Vocals – Misia
- Songwriting – Misia, Mike Wyzgowski, Shirō Sagisu
- Arrangement, programming, production – Shirō Sagisu, Elliot James
- Drums, guitar, bass, electronic keyboard – Elliot James
- Orchestra – The London Studio Orchestra
- Engineering – Shirō Sagisu, Elliot James, Philip Bagenal, Rupert Coulson
- Mixing – Masahiro Kawaguchi
- Mastering – Herb Powers Jr.

== Charts ==
Chart (2011)	Peak position
Japan Hot 100 (Billboard)	67
Japan Hot Top Airplay (Billboard)	47
Japan Adult Contemporary Airplay (Billboard)	55
