= Soul Quest =

Studio album by Misia
- Released: July 27, 2011
- Genres: R&B; pop; soul; disco
- Length: 45:33
- Label: Ariola Japan
- Producers: Gomi; David Foster; Elliot James; JP; M2J; Toshiaki Matsumoto; Misia (exec.); Shirō Sagisu; Tohru Shigemi; Hiroto Tanigawa (exec.); Jochem van der Saag

Misia chronology
Just Ballade (2009)	Soul Quest (2011)	Misia no Mori: Forest Covers (2011)

Singles from Soul Quest
- 1. "Edge of This World" Released: April 28, 2010; 2. "Life in Harmony" Released: September 15, 2010; 3. "Kioku" Released: May 25, 2011

Soul Quest (stylized as SOUL QUEST) is the tenth studio album by Japanese singer Misia. It was released on July 27, 2011, through Ariola Japan. The album yielded three official singles, the digital exclusives "Edge of This World" and "Life in Harmony", and the sole physical release "Kioku". The lead track, "This Is Me", served as promotional single for the album.

== Background and release ==
Misia stated in an interview with EMTG Music that the theme for the album was "modern soul". She wanted to take a departure from the ballad-heavy sound of Just Ballade to concentrate on creating an R&B record. Misia cites soul records from past decades as her inspiration, describing a desire to incorporate soulful melodies with a contemporary digital sound to create a fusion.

Soul Quest is Misia's first studio album in over a year and a half. It was released in two distinct formats, one standard edition and a limited two-disc edition featuring a 77-minute non-stop DJ mix of various fan favorite songs, produced by Muro. The album was supported by The Tour of Misia Japan Soul Quest, which started prior to the album's release in February 2011 and was extended through February 2012.

Several songs off the album received commercial tie-ins: "Subarashī Mono o Sagashi ni Ikō" and "Manatsu no Chameleon" were both featured on the AX variety show Himitsu no Kenmin Show, while "Ame no Sonata" was used in H&S commercials, and "Kimi ni wa Uso o Tsukenai" in commercials for the Japanese financial company Gaitame Japan.

== Commercial performance ==
Soul Quest entered the daily Oricon Albums Chart at number 4, where it also peaked. It debuted at number 7 on the weekly Oricon Albums Chart, with sales of 20,000 copies. The album debuted one position higher, at number 6, on the Billboard Japan Top Albums Sales chart. Soul Quest charted for fifteen weeks on the Oricon Albums Chart, selling a reported total of 40,000 copies during its run.

== Track listing ==
No.	Title	Writer(s)	Producer(s)	Length
1.	"Soul Quest Overture"	Shirō Sagisu	Sagisu	1:53
2.	"This Is Me"	Misia; Mike Wyzgowski; Sagisu	Sagisu; Elliot James	3:56
3.	"Edge of This World"	Misia; Sinkiroh	Gomi	4:37
4.	"Subarashī Mono o Sagashi ni Ikō" (featuring Muro) (素晴らしいもの探しに行こう, "Let's Find Something Wonderful")	Misia; Muro; JP	M2J	3:39
5.	"Kioku"	Misia; Gorō Matsui; BZ4U	Sagisu	5:12
6.	"Ame no Sonata" (雨のソナタ, "Rainy Sonata")	Misia; JP	JP	3:35
7.	"Kimi ni wa Uso o Tsukenai" (君には嘘をつけない, "I Can't Lie to You")	Hinata; Joi	Tohru Shigemi	5:34
8.	"Manatsu no Chameleon" (真夏のカメレオン, Manatsu no Kamereon, "Midsummer Chameleon")	Misia; JP	JP	3:41
9.	"Maware Maware" (featuring M2J and Francis Jocky)	Misia; JP	M2J	3:41
10.	"Life in Harmony"	Misia; yellowRubato	David Foster; Jochem van der Saag	5:02
11.	"Ashita e"	Misia; Toshiaki Matsumoto	Matsumoto	4:43
Total length:				45:33

iTunes Store pre-order bonus track
No.	Title	Writer(s)	Remixer(s)	Length
12.	"Can't Take My Eyes Off of You" (Soul Quest Extended Version)	Bob Crewe; Bob Gaudio	Gomi	5:26
Total length:				50:59

Limited edition bonus disc: 77 Minutes of Misia Mixed by Muro
No.	Title	Length
1.	"Subarashī Mono o Sagashi ni Ikō" (featuring Muro)	2:14
2.	"Yes Forever" (Muro's "Promo" Mix)	1:37
3.	"Tsutsumikomu Yō ni..." (DJ Watarai Remix featuring Muro)	3:07
4.	"Believe" (DJ Watarai Remix)	1:45
5.	"Escape" (DJ Watarai Remix)	1:53
6.	"Manatsu no Chameleon" (Dub Mix)	3:32
7.	"Hi no Ataru Basho" (Original Mix)	1:58
8.	"Key of Love (Ai no Yukue)" (Acoustic Crab Soul Mix)	2:23
9.	"This Is Me"	2:39
10.	"Catch the Rainbow"	5:04
11.	"Sweet Pain" (Francois K. Remix)	6:27
12.	"Sweetness" (Satoshi Tomiie Sweeter 12" Mix)	6:03
13.	"Into the Light" (David Sussman's Mix)	4:08
14.	"Everything" (Junior + Gomi Club Extended Mix)	5:22
15.	"Taiyō no Chizu" (Gomi's Vajra Mix)	3:35
16.	"Sukoshi Zutsu Taisetsu ni" (Gomi's The World Is Waiting for a Change Mix)	5:10
17.	"Life in Harmony" (Gomi's Love & Harmony Remix)	5:09
18.	"Hoshi no Yō ni..." (Gomi's Ultra Legend Mix)	6:00
19.	"Maware Maware" (Gomi's Tribal Mix - Gomi's Lair Club Remix)	4:41
20.	"Can't Take My Eyes Off of You" (Extended Version)	4:03
Total length:		1:16:59

== Charts ==
Chart (2011)	Peak position
Japan Daily Albums (Oricon)	4
Japan Weekly Albums (Oricon)	7
Japan Monthly Albums (Oricon)	29
Japan Top Albums Sales (Billboard)	6

== Sales ==
Region	Certification	Certified units/sales
Japan	—	40,000
