= Koi wa Owaranai Zutto =

Single by Misia

from the album Super Best Records: 15th Celebration
- Released: June 20, 2012
- Recorded: April 14, 2012
- Studio: Sound Valley; Onkio Haus; Rmt Studio
- Genre: Pop; R&B
- Length: 4:37
- Label: Ariola Japan
- Songwriters: Misia; Jun Sasaki
- Producer: Misia

Misia singles chronology
"Kioku" (2012)	"Koi wa Owaranai Zutto" (2012)	"Deepness" (2012)

Music video
- "Koi wa Owaranai Zutto" on YouTube

"Koi wa Owaranai Zutto" (恋(こい)は終(お)わらないずっと; lit. "Love Never Ends") is a song recorded by Japanese singer Misia. It was co-written by Misia and Jun Sasaki and produced by Misia. "Koi wa Owaranai Zutto" was released as a single simultaneously with the Tour of Misia Japan Soul Quest concert DVD on June 20, 2012, through Ariola Japan. The title track served as theme song for the NHK drama series Hatsukoi, starring Yoshino Kimura.

== Background and release ==
"Koi wa Owaranai Zutto" is Misia's first single in over a year and first since the release of her tenth studio album, Soul Quest. The first pressing of the physical release includes a poetry anthology written by Misia on the theme of "first love", titled Hatsukoi Uta (はつ恋歌). Along with the title track, the single features the B-side "Hyakunen Ai", co-written by essayist Mayumi Satō, a stripped-down, acoustic piano version of "Koi wa Owaranai Zutto" and a remixed version of Misia's Japanese-language rendition of "Ribbon in the Sky" by Stevie Wonder, from the cover album Misia no Mori: Forest Covers. A digital exclusive version, dubbed the Deluxe Edition, including an additional remix of "Koi wa Owaranai Zutto", was released a week later, on June 27, 2012.

== Artwork ==
The artwork for the single was designed by Japanese balloon art group Daisy Balloon, who also designed the costumes for the Tour of Misia Japan Soul Quest Grand Finale 2012. The single's cover art depicts Misia wearing a floral headpiece and shoulder ornaments, made entirely of balloon material, and holding a bear-shaped balloon. The red apple sitting on the bear's head is meant to represent the intensity of a first love.

== Composition ==
"Koi wa Owaranai Zutto" was written by Misia and composed and arranged by Jun Sasaki. It is Misia's first single to be co-written by Sasaki since "Aitakute Ima". The song is composed in the key of A-flat major and set to a common time tempo of 77 beats per minute. Misia's vocals span from G_{3} to E♭_{5}. The lyrics, written specifically to echo the plot of Hatsukoi, tell the story of a protagonist who is unable to forget her first love. The series marks the second collaboration between Misia and screenwriter Miho Nakazono, since Yamato Nadeshiko (2000), for which Misia's "Everything" served as theme song. In a press release, Misia explained, "love, even if lost, is something that lives on in our memories and can change the course of our lives." After reading the script, Misia describes being inspired to put into song the feeling of "endless love".

== Critical reception ==
"Koi wa Owaranai Zutto" was praised as "authentic" by CDJournal critics, and compared to "Everything" for the analogous vocal restraint shown by Misia. Her vocal performance was described as "passionate". Misia and Sasaki received acclaim for their musical compatibility.

== Music video ==
=== Background ===
The music video for "Koi wa Owaranai Zutto" was filmed in May 2012 in Hokkaido and was directed by Mitsuo Shindō. It premiered on May 24, 2012, on Space Shower TV's Big Hits! program. The video was filmed at several locations throughout Hokkaido, including Lake Cimi-ke-p (チミケップ湖) in the town of Tsubetsu, where the album cover for Misia's EP The Glory Day was photographed, the Pierson Memorial Museum (ピアソン記念館), in the city of Kitami, and the surroundings of Notoro Point Lighthouse (能取岬灯台), in Abashiri city.

=== Synopsis ===
Misia stares out of the window of a moving train.

The video's concept shows Misia traveling around various locations seemingly reminiscing on her first love. The video begins with a shot from a car moving through a Hokkaido street. Misia is then seen wandering along a lake shore as the first verse begins. The camera fades into a shot of Misia looking out of the window of a moving train. She is then shown, in profile, singing the pre-chorus. Misia dons a white chiffon dress as she stands next to a tree by the shore. A close-up shot of the bottom-half of the dress follows and Misia is seen holding a bouquet of baby's-breath. The camera alternates between shots of Misia sitting in the train and shots of the Hokkaido scenery. As the second verse kicks in, Misia is shown from the side, sitting on the edge of a sofa. As she begins to sing, she turns around to face a window. Shots of Misia driving a car and resting in it are inter-cut with shots of the neighboring scenery. The camera then fades back to a seated Misia. This is followed by more shots of scenery, a café, and of Misia leaning against a stone wall. Misia is shown gazing out of a window, singing the second chorus, while different shots are inter-cut. She is then seen walking toward a lighthouse. As the bridge comes to an end, the camera fades to a shot of the singer walking on a dock in her white dress. The camera cuts to a shot of Misia dressed in black and playing the piano while singing. The final chorus swells and several shots of Misia singing are repeated. The video ends with a shot of Misia resting her chin on her hand and staring out of the same train window as her name and the title of the song appear in white font.

== Chart performance ==
"Koi wa Owaranai Zutto" made its chart debut on the weekly Recochoku truetones chart, ranking at number 27. The song peaked on the weekly RecoChoku singles chart at number 14. The single entered the daily Oricon Singles Chart at number 11, where it also peaked. "Koi wa Owaranai Zutto" debuted at number 17 on the weekly Oricon Singles Chart, with 5,000 copies sold. It charted for seven consecutive weeks and sold a reported total of 11,000 copies during its run.

== Track listing ==
No.	Title	Writer(s)	Arranger(s)	Length
1.	"Koi wa Owaranai Zutto" (恋は終わらないずっと, "Love Never Ends")	Misia; Jun Sasaki	Sasaki	4:37
2.	"Hyakunen Ai" (百年愛, "Love for a Century")	Mayumi Satō; Sasaki	Sasaki	5:30
3.	"Koi wa Owaranai Zutto" (Acoustic Version)	Misia; Sasaki	Tohru Shigemi	5:01
4.	"Ribbon in the Sky" (Gomi's Lair Club Remix)	Stevie Wonder	Gomi	7:38
Total length:				22:46

Deluxe edition
No.	Title	Writer(s)	Arranger(s)	Length
5.	"Koi wa Owaranai Zutto" (Gomi's Lair Club Mix)	Misia; Sasaki	Gomi	8:00
Total length:				30:46

== Credits and personnel ==
Personnel

- Vocals, production – Misia
- Songwriting – Misia, Jun Sasaki
- Arrangement, additional instrumentation – Jun Sasaki
- Electronic keyboard – Tohru Shigemi
- Drums – Fuyu
- Bass – Takeshi Taneda
- Guitar – Takashi Yamaguchi
- Strings arrangement – Gen Ittetsu Strings
- Strings – Gen Ittetsu Strings
- Horns – Otohiko Fujita, Yoshiyuki Uema, Atsushi Katsumata, Marie Fujita
- Engineering – Masahiro Kawaguchi, Noriyasu Murase, Colin Suzuki
- Mixing – Masashi Hashimoto
- Mastering – Herb Powers Jr.

== Charts ==
Chart (2012)	Peak position	Sales
Japan Daily Singles (Oricon)	11	11,000
Japan Weekly Singles (Oricon)	17	11,000
Japan Weekly Singles (SoundScan)	17	11,000
Japan Hot 100 (Billboard)	16	11,000
Japan Adult Contemporary Airplay (Billboard)	30	11,000
Japan Hot Top Airplay (Billboard)	26	11,000
Japan Hot Singles Sales (Billboard)	15	11,000
Japan Weekly Singles (Recochoku)	14	11,000
Japan Weekly Truetones (Recochoku)	27	11,000
