= Life in Harmony =

Single by Misia

from the album David Foster Presents Love, Again and Soul Quest
- Released: September 15, 2010
- Recorded: August 4, 2010
- Studio: Chartmaker Studios
- Genre: Pop
- Length: 5:05
- Label: Ariola Japan
- Songwriters: Misia; yellowRubato
- Producers: David Foster; Jochem van der Saag

Misia singles chronology
"Edge of This World" (2010)	"Life in Harmony" (2010)	"Kioku" (2011)

"Life in Harmony" (stylized as "LIFE IN HARMONY") is a song recorded by Japanese singer Misia for her tenth studio album, Soul Quest. It was released as a digital single on September 15, 2010. A CD single was produced and included as a limited bonus on the Hoshizora no Live VI Encore 2010 International Year of Biodiversity concert DVD. The four-track CD single was later released as a digital EP on November 10, 2010. "Life in Harmony" was the official song for the tenth Convention on Biological Diversity (COP 10), of which Misia was named an honorary ambassador. Misia performed the song at the convention held at the Nagoya Congress Center on October 18, 2010.

== Composition ==
"Life in Harmony" was written by Misia, composed by Korean composer Hwang Hyun, credited under the pseudonym yellowRubato. The track was co-produced by David Foster and Jochem van der Saag. The collaboration between Misia and Foster came about as Foster was looking for an Asian singer to participate in his latest compilation album David Foster Presents Love, Again. After hearing Misia's voice, which he likened to that of Mariah Carey and Celine Dion, he decided instantly to work with her. Foster was so impressed with Misia that he hailed her as a "national treasure".

Misia was inspired by the COP 10 slogan, "life in harmony, into the future", to write lyrics that reflect on the unity between all life forms. The song was recorded in Malibu, California, on August 4, 2010. In late August 2010, the executive secretary for the Convention on Biological Diversity, Ahmed Djoghlaf, met with Misia in Japan where he listened to the song and requested it be made the COP10's official song.

== Track listing ==
All tracks are written by Misia and yellowRubato.

No.	Title	Producer(s)	Length
1.	"Life in Harmony"	David Foster; Jochem van der Saag	5:05
2.	"Life in Harmony" (Hoshizora no Live VI in Kanazawa)	Tohru Shigemi	5:45
3.	"Life in Harmony" (Gomi's Love & Harmony Remix)	Gomi	5:08
4.	"Life in Harmony" (Instrumental)	Foster; van der Saag	5:02
Total length:			21:00

== Credits and personnel ==
Personnel

- Vocals – Misia
- Backing vocals – JP
- Songwriting – Misia, yellowRubato
- Production – David Foster, Jochem van der Saag
- Arrangement, electronic keyboard – David Foster
- Guitar – Michael Thompson
- Engineering – Jochem van der Saag, Jorge Vivo
- Synthesizer, programming, mixing – Jochem van der Saag
- Mastering – Masahiro Kawaguchi
