= Edge of This World =

Single by Misia

from the album Soul Quest
- Released: April 28, 2010
- Studio: RMT Studio; Onkio Haus; Gomi's Lair Studio
- Genre: Electropop; house
- Length: 4:36
- Label: Ariola Japan
- Songwriters: Misia; Sinkiroh
- Producer: Gomi

Misia singles chronology
"Hoshi no Yō ni..." (2009)	"Edge of This World" (2010)	"Life in Harmony" (2010)

Audio sample
- "Edge of This World": file; help

Music video
- "Edge of This World" on YouTube

"Edge of This World" (stylized as "EDGE OF THIS WORLD") is a song recorded by Japanese singer Misia for her tenth studio album, Soul Quest. It was released by Ariola Japan in truetone format on April 14, 2011 and as a digital single on April 28, 2011. It is the theme song to the anime film adaptation of King of Thorn.

== Composition ==
"Edge of This World" was composed in the key of E minor and set to a common time tempo of 123 beats per minute. Misia's vocals span from A_{3} to D_{5}. The song was created right after the release of Just Ballade. Misia describes it as an "edgy ballad" with a "dark electro and house" sound. Misia has stated that the message expressed in her lyrics, that you can "shape the world to your desires", is a direct reflection of her feelings at the time and what led to creating the soulful R&B sound of Soul Quest. King of Thorn director Kazuyoshi Katayama has stated that he never considered anyone other than Misia to sing to theme song to his film.

== Critical reception ==
CDJournal critics describe the song as a "love song with a serious mood" about "universal love". Misia was praised for the conscientious message of her lyrics.

== Chart performance ==
"Edge of This World" debuted at number 43 on the Billboard Japan Hot Top Airplay chart and at number 48 on the Hot 100 chart. The song fell eighth spots down to number 56 on the Hot 100 in its second week and down to number 77 on its third week.

== Credits and personnel ==
Personnel

- Vocals – Misia
- Songwriting – Misia, Sinkiroh
- Production, mixing – Gomi
- Strings arrangement – Gen Ittetsu
- Strings – Gen Ittetsu Strings
- Electronic keyboard – Satoshi Shimano, Henry Hey, Ethan White, Gomi
- Engineering – Ken Nishi, Noriyasu Murase
- Mastering – Gene Grimaldi

== Charts ==
Chart (2011)	Peak position
Japan Hot 100 (Billboard)	48
Japan Hot Top Airplay (Billboard)	43
