= Misia Remix 2000 Little Tokyo =

Remix album by Misia
- Released: April 19, 2000
- Genre: House
- Length: 96:14
- Label: Arista Japan

Misia chronology
Love Is the Message (2000)	Misia Remix 2000 Little Tokyo (2000)	Marvelous (2001)

Misia Remix 2000 Little Tokyo is the second remix album of Japanese R&B singer Misia, released on April 19, 2000. It debuted atop of the weekly Oricon albums chart with 234,190 copies sold. Misia Remix 2000 Little Tokyo is the second highest-selling remix album of all time in Japan, succeeding TRF's Hyper Mix 4.

== Track listing ==
Disc one
No.	Title	Remixer(s)	Length
1.	"Sweetness (Satoshi Tomiie Sweeter 12" Mix)"	Satoshi Tomiie	10:37
2.	"Holding My Heart... (Tsutsumikomu Yō ni...) (Dodge Soul Inside Mix) (Holding My Heart... (つつみ込むように・・・) (DODGE SOUL INSIDE MIX))"	Dodge	5:58
3.	"Melody (Masters At Work Remix)"	Masters At Work	8:32
4.	"Believe (DJ Watarai Remix)"	DJ Watarai	5:49
5.	"A Place in the Sun (Hi no Ataru Basho) (Shomari Remix) (A PLACE IN THE SUN (陽のあたる場所) (SHOMARI REMIX))"	Shomari	5:30
6.	"Loving Season (Koisuru Kisetsu) (Martin Lascelles Remix) (LOVING SEASON (恋する季節) (MARTIN LASCELLES REMIX))"	Martin Lascelles	5:56
7.	"Cry (Gomi Remix)"	Gomi	11:09
8.	"Unforgettable Days (Wasurenai Hibi) (Hex Hector's Club Mix) (UNFORGETTABLE DAYS (忘れない日々) (HEX HECTOR'S CLUB MIX))"	Hex Hector	9:29

Disc two
No.	Title	Remixer(s)	Length
1.	"Sweet Pain (François K. Remix)"	François Kevorkian	9:58
2.	"The Glory Day (Malawi Rocks Remix)"	Malawi Rocks	11:54
3.	"Never Gonna Cry! (Junior Vasquez Remix)"	Junior Vasquez	11:07

== Charts ==
=== Oricon Sales Chart ===
Release	Chart	Peak position	Debut sales	Sales total
April 19, 2000	Oricon Daily Albums Chart	1		830,640
April 19, 2000	Oricon Weekly Albums Chart	1	234,190	830,640
April 19, 2000	Oricon Monthly Albums Chart	3		830,640
April 19, 2000	Oricon Yearly Albums Chart	27		830,640

=== Physical sales charts ===
Chart	Peak position
Oricon Daily Albums Chart	1
Oricon Weekly Albums Chart	1
Oricon Monthly Albums Chart	3
Oricon Yearly Albums Chart	27
Soundscan Albums Chart (CD-Only)	1
