= JP (musician) =

American singer and songwriter (born 1984)

JP Lam
- Born: John Paul Lam; April 20, 1984 (age 42); Honolulu, Hawaii, United States
- Origin: Seoul, South Korea; Tokyo, Japan
- Genres: Pop, R&B
- Instruments: Vocals, piano, guitar, ukulele
- Years active: 2007–present)
- Label: Rhythmedia
- Website: bananaboat.jp

John Paul "JP" Lam (born April 20, 1984 in Honolulu, Hawaii) is an American singer and songwriter. He is notable for his collaborations with R&B singer Misia, which have found widespread popularity in South Korea and Japan. In 2012, he released his debut solo single which serves as the opening theme song to the anime Shirokuma Cafe.

== Early life ==
JP was born in Honolulu, Hawaii. He attended the Punahou School, graduating in 2002, and then attended Pepperdine University on a vocal performance scholarship where he majored in telecommunications.

== Career ==
After graduating from Pepperdine, JP worked as a back-up vocalist for Michael W. Smith along with American Idol winner Jordin Sparks. In 2007, TVXQ used his composition "Yeo Haeng Gi", which was included on one of the SM Town albums, and then moved to South Korea to continue his career in music.

In 2009, JP moved to Tokyo, Japan and began collaborating with R&B singer Misia. The first song he wrote for her was "Work It Out", which was included on her 2009 album Just Ballade. JP also wrote her song "Ultra X'mas", which was included as a B-side on Misia's winter single "Hoshi no Yō ni...". In 2010, Misia and JP collaborated again on the song "Maware Maware", her contribution to the 2010 FIFA World Cup album Listen Up!, where he and Japanese DJ Muro are credited under their collective name "M2J". JP also collaborated with Misia on her 2011 album Soul Quest, writing and performing on several tracks, as well as supporting her on her tour for the album.

In 2012, JP had his solo debut on the Avex Group record label with the song "Boku ni Invitation" which serves as the opening theme song for the Shirokuma Cafe anime series.

== Discography ==
=== Singles ===
- "Boku ni Invitation" (ボクにインビテーション, Boku ni Inbitēshon) – June 20, 2012

=== Compositions ===
==== TVXQ ====
2007 SM Town Winter – 2007

- "Yeo Haeng Gi (TRAVELLING)"

Tone – 2011

- "Thank you my girl"

==== Misia ====
Just Ballade – 2009

- "Work It Out"

"Hoshi no Yō ni..." - 2009

- "Ultra X'mas"

Listen Up! – 2010

- "Maware Maware"

"Kioku" – 2011

- "Kono Mama de Tonight"

Soul Quest – 2011

- "Ame no Sonata"
- "Subarashii Mono Sagashi ni Ikou"
- "Kimi ni wa Uso o Tsukenai"
- "Manatsu no Chameleon"

==== Supernova ====
Hop Step Jumping! – 2010

- "Million Dollar Baby
