= Maware Maware =

2010 single by Misia and Francis Jocky

Song by Misia featuring M2J and Francis Jocky

from the album Listen Up! The Official 2010 FIFA World Cup Album and Soul Quest
- Studio: RMT Studio; Studio Terra; Quad Recording Studios
- Genre: Pop; dance
- Length: 3:41
- Label: Ariola Japan
- Songwriters: Misia; JP
- Producer: M2J

Music video
- "Maware Maware" on YouTube

"Maware Maware" (lit. "Spin, Spin", stylized as "MAWARE MAWARE" in Japan) is a song recorded by Japanese singer Misia featuring Muro and JP, credited under the pseudonym M2J, and French-Cameroonian singer Francis Jocky. The song was released through the official soundtrack of the 2010 FIFA World Cup, Listen Up! The Official 2010 FIFA World Cup Album, making Misia the first Asian artist to contribute a song for a FIFA album.

== Release ==
The song was first released on the Listen Up! The Official 2010 FIFA World Cup Album on May 31, 2010. It was later included on Misia's tenth studio album, Soul Quest (2011). A remix by DJ Gomi was released digitally on May 25, 2011, simultaneously with the single "Kioku", on which it is included as a first pressing bonus track.

== Composition ==
"Maware Maware" is primarily sung by Misia in English. Jocky sings the bridge in Duala, one of the various languages of Cameroon. The chorus features Misia incorporating six greetings in various languages, including English ("Hello"), Japanese ("Konnichiwa"), Swahili ("Jambo!"), Spanish ("Hola"), French ("Bonjour"), and Zulu ("Sawubona"). The music video also features this greeting motif and other greetings in Portuguese ("Boa Tarde") and Chinese ("Ni Hao") shown in 3D art.

== Performances ==
The first performance of "Maware Maware" was held at a Sony make.believe showcase in Roppongi Hills in Tokyo on May 10, 2010. The song was later performed in another Sony showcase held in South Africa, right before the Japan vs Cameroon match on June 14, 2010. The music video premiered the following day. Misia opened every show of her Hoshizora no Live VI Encore 2010 International Year of Biodiversity concert tour with "Maware Maware". She also performed the song during her The Tour of Misia Soul Quest tour.

== Chart performance ==
"Maware Maware" debuted at number 87 on the Billboard Japan Billboard Japan Hot 100 chart. The song peaked the following week at number 55.

== Credits and personnel ==
Personnel

- Vocals – Misia
- Backing vocals – Misia, Francis Jocky, JP, Hiroto Tanigawa, Mitsuo Shindō
- Songwriting – Misia, JP
- Production, programming – M2J
- Guitar – Francis Jocky
- Strings arrangement – Gen Ittetsu
- Strings – Gen Ittetsu Strings
- Mixing – Masashi Hashimoto
- Engineering – Ken Nishi, Noriyasu Murase, Mike Freyer
- Mastering – Herb Powers Jr.

== Charts ==
Chart (2010)	Peak position
Japan Hot 100 (Billboard)	55
Japan Hot Top Airplay (Billboard)	47

== Japanese version ==
"Maware Maware"

Single by Misia featuring Doudou N'Diaye Rose
- Released: May 29, 2013
- Genre: Pop; afrobeats
- Length: 4:06
- Label: Ariola Japan
- Songwriters: Misia; JP

Misia singles chronology
"Back in Love Again" (2012)	"Maware Maware" (2013)	"Shiawase o Forever" (2013)

Audio sample
- "Maware Maware": file; help

In 2013, Misia recorded a Japanese version of "Maware Maware" featuring Senegalese drummer Doudou N'Diaye Rose. The song was released in support of the fifth Tokyo International Conference on African Development (TICAD-V) on May 29, 2013. A portion of the proceeds from the song went towards providing mosquito nets to children for malaria prevention.
