= Shirō Sagisu =

Japanese composer & arranger (born 1957)

Shirō Sagisu 鷺巣 詩郎
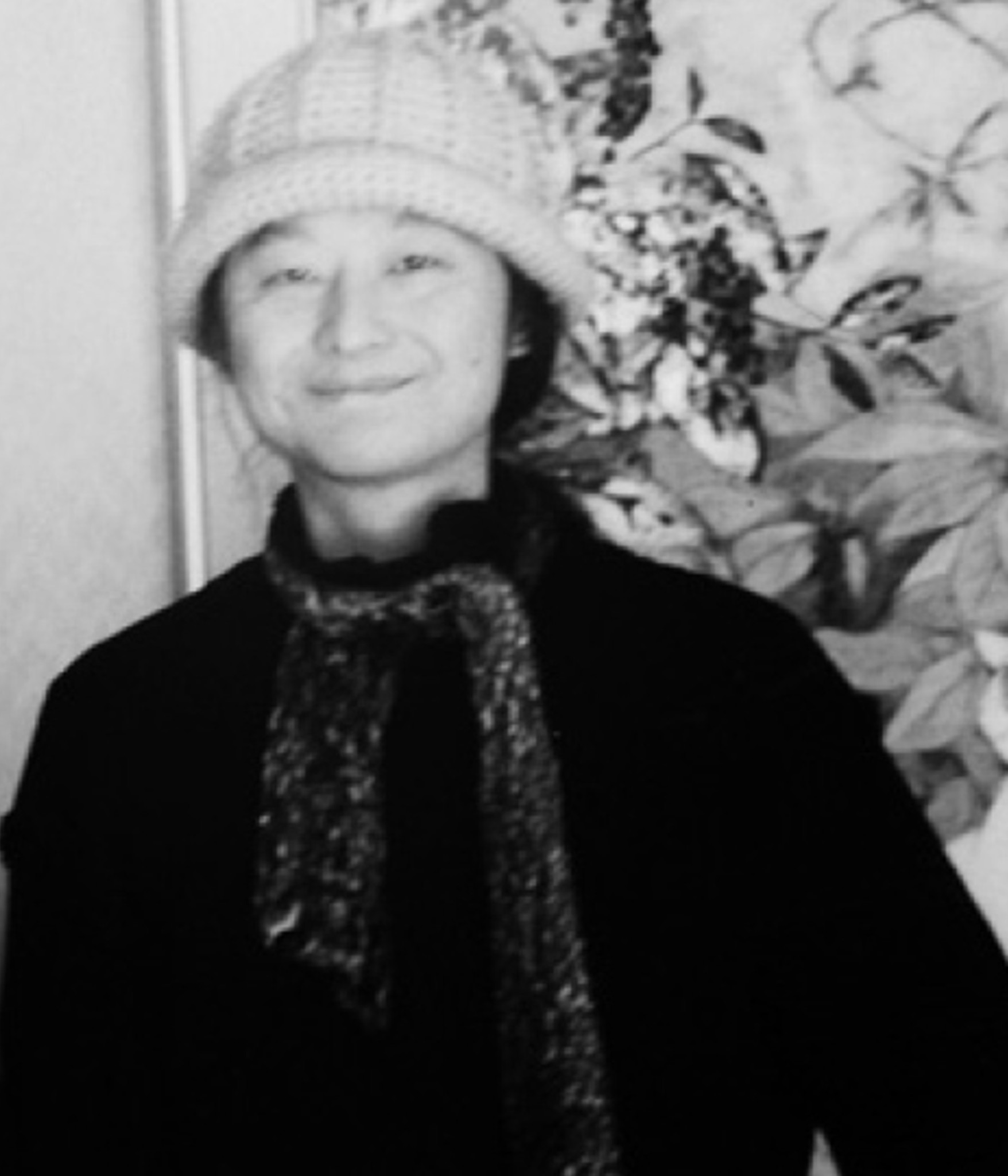
- Sagisu c. 2004

Background information
- Born: August 29, 1957 (age 69); Setagaya, Tokyo, Japan
- Genres: Symphonic; film score; J-pop; kayōkyoku
- Occupations: Composer; arranger; music producer
- Years active: 1978–present
- Website: Official website

Shirō Sagisu (鷺巣 詩郎, Sagisu Shirō; born August 29, 1957) is a Japanese composer, arranger and music producer. With a career spanning over 40 years (beginning in the late 1970s), he is best known for his works as a record producer for acts including various choir members Mike Wyzgowski, Misia, Satoshi Tomiie, and Ken Hirai. Sagisu has also worked as a film composer for several anime and films, being well known for his collaborations with Gainax, especially in the soundtrack of Hideaki Anno's series Neon Genesis Evangelion.

Sagisu's career in music started in 1977, when he became one of the members of jazz fusion band T-Square. He made three albums with the group before becoming a full-time composer and writer in 1979. By 1997, he had composed over 2,000 songs, advertising jingles and TV and movie pieces. Sagisu won the Tokyo Anime Award for "Best Music" in 2010 for Evangelion: 2.0 You Can (Not) Advance. Sagisu arranged a rendition of the Japanese national anthem, "Kimigayo", performed at the 2020 Summer Olympics opening ceremony by Misia.

== Discography ==
=== Solo ===
Year	Title	Notes	Ref.
1979	EYES	With Somethin' Special	
1980	Pole Position 2	With Somethin' Special	
1994	Final Fantasy VI Grand Finale	Orchestral arrangement of 11 tracks from the game Final Fantasy VI; Co-arranged with Tsuneyoshi Saito	
1999	Shiro's Songbook		
2000	Shiro's Songbook 2		
2001	Tribute to Cool! Shiro's Songbook 2.5		
2001	5.1 Gospel Songbook		
2002	Shiro's Songbook "Remixes and More"		
2003	Shiro's Songbook Selection London Freedom Choir		
2005	Shiro's Songbook Ver 7.0		
2013	Shiro's Songbook Xpressions		
2017	Shiro's Songbook The Hidden Wonder of Music		
2018	Shiro's Ani-Songbook		
2022	Shiro's Songbook 11		
2022	Shiro's Songbook Bleach Bankai!		

=== T-Square ===
Year	Title	Ref.
1978	Lucky Summer Lady	
1978	Midnight Lover	
1979	Make Me A Star	

== Works ==
=== Anime ===
==== TV series ====
Year	Title	Ref.
1984	Attacker You!	
1987	Kimagure Orange Road	
1990	Nadia: The Secret of Blue Water	
1995	Neon Genesis Evangelion	
1998	His and Her Circumstances	
2002	Magical Shopping Arcade Abenobashi	
2004	Bleach	
2007	Skull Man	
2012	Magi: The Labyrinth of Magic	
2013	Magi: The Kingdom of Magic	
2014	Black Bullet	
2016	Berserk	
2018	SSSS.Gridman	
2021	SSSS.Dynazenon	
2022	Berserk: The Golden Age Arc – Memorial Edition	
2022	Bleach: Thousand-Year Blood War	

==== Films and original video animations ====
Year	Title	Notes	Ref.
1985	Leda: The Fantastic Adventure of Yohko		
1985	Megazone 23 Part I		
1986	Ai City		
1987	Megazone 23 Part II		
1987	Battle Royal High School		
1988	I Want to Return to That Day		
1991	Nadia: The Secret of Blue Water – The Motion Picture		
1992	Macross II		
1992	Ushio & Tora	Composer for the first six episodes	
1996	Garzey's Wing		
1997	Neon Genesis Evangelion: Death & Rebirth		
1997	The End of Evangelion		
2006	Bleach: Memories of Nobody		
2007	Evangelion: 1.0 You Are (Not) Alone		
2007	Bleach: The DiamondDust Rebellion		
2008	Bleach: Fade to Black		
2009	Evangelion: 2.0 You Can (Not) Advance		
2010	Bleach: Hell Verse		
2012	Berserk: The Golden Age Arc		
2012	Evangelion: 3.0 You Can (Not) Redo		
2014	until You come to me.	Japan Animator Expo's short	
2015	On a Gloomy Night	Japan Animator Expo's short	
2015	Memoirs of Amorous Gentlemen	Japan Animator Expo's short	
2021	Evangelion: 3.0+1.0 Thrice Upon a Time		
2023	Gridman Universe		

=== Theatrical films ===
Year	Title	Ref.
2001	Musa	
2004	Casshern	
2006	The Restless	
2015	Attack on Titan	
2016	Shin Godzilla	
2020	Wotakoi	
2022	Shin Ultraman	
2023	An Endless Sunday	

=== Television dramas ===
Year	Title	Ref.
2002	Love Quotient	
2010	Tomehane! Suzuri Kōkō Shodōbu	
2025	Mr. Mikami's Classroom	

=== Video games ===
Year	Title	Ref.
TBA	Project GAMM	

== Songwriting credits ==
=== 1980s ===
Show more

List of songs arranged for other artists, showing year released and album name
Year	Title	Artist(s)	Album/Single
1981	"Sentimental Journey"	Iyo Matsumoto	Sentimental Journey
1981	"Hitokakera no Natsu", "Time Capsule", "Yakan Hikou", "Scramble no Koutsuuten"	Iyo Matsumoto	Sentimental Iyo
1982	"Love me Tender", "Nijiiro no Fantasy"	Iyo Matsumoto	Love me Tender
1982	"TV no Kuni kara Kira Kira", "Pata Pata"	Iyo Matsumoto	TV no Kuni kara Kira Kira
1982	"Otona Janaino", "Koi wa Ban Ban"	Iyo Matsumoto	Otona Janaino
1982	"Dakishimetai", "Kiss In The Dream"	Iyo Matsumoto	Dakishimetai
1982	"Majokko Seventeen", "Pandora no Yume", "Frio no Natsu", "Nageki no Nightingale", "Tasogare no Poem"	Iyo Matsumoto	Only Seventeen
1982	"Crystal Love", "Born to be a star",	Hideki Saijo	Crystal Love
1982	"Ano Koro ni Mou Ichido", "Ai no Bracelet"	Yu Hayami	Ano Koro ni Mou Ichido
1982	"Meguriai" (めぐりあい)	Daisuke Inoue	Meguriai
1983	"Taiyou ga Ippai", "Namida no Handkief"	Iyo Matsumoto	Taiyou ga Ippai
1983	"Toki ni Ai wa", "Shinju no Earring"	Iyo Matsumoto	Toki ni Ai wa
1983	"Oshare Namida"	Iyo Matsumoto	Endless Summer
1983	"Akai Ribbon no Present", "Shigeki Kudasai Boy", "Snow Flake Samba", "Koigokoro 3 Octave", "For you, Christmas"	Iyo Matsumoto	Yume Hitotsu Shinkirou
1983	"Chinese Kiss", "Elliot"	Iyo Matsumoto	Chinese Kiss
1983	"Sayonara no Monogatari", "Yasashisa no Yokogao"	Chiemi Hori	Sayonara no Monogatari
1983	"Natsuiro no Diary", "Taiyou no Romance"	Chiemi Hori	Natsuiro no Diary
1983	"Good-by Winter", "Anemone no Shoukei", "Love Me!", "Morning Ranvedouz", "Shyna Boy", "12Gatsu no Inori"	Chiemi Hori	Yuki no Concerto
1983	"Sweet Surrender", "WANGAN High Way"	Miki Matsubara	Sweet Surrender
1983	"Moonlight Review"	Miki Matsubara	Revue
1983	"Weather Song", "45 Nichi"	Naoko Kawai	Half Shadow
1984	"Kaze no Magical"	Kyoko Koizumi	Nagisa no Haikara Ningyou
1984	"Control"	Naoko Kawai	Control
1984	"Kuchibiru no Privacy", "Mebius no Kagami"	Naoko Kawai	Kuchibiru no Privacy
1984	"Taiyou no Shita no Stranger", "Machikado", "Maboroshi no Natsu"	Naoko Kawai	Summer Delicacy
1984	"Ai wa Kagirinaku", "Still Love Me"	Hiromi Go	Ougonkyou I: 2oku 4senman no Hitomi
1984	"Haru wa Sara Sara"	Youko Nagayama	Haru wa Sara Sara
1984	"Shabon", "Pianissimo"	Youko Nagayama	Shabon
1984	"100Man Tsubu no Namida"	Shibugakitai	Beranmee! Dandy
1984	"Kokuhaku: Aisuru Hito he", "Hoshizora kara Merry Christmas"	Shibugakitai	Honesty: Maji
1984	"Seishun Prelude" (青春プレリュード)	Harumi Kamo	Seishun Prelude
1984	"Love with You: Ai no Present" (Love with You ～愛のプレゼント～)	Chie Kobayashi	Love with You: Ai no Present
1985	"Gekka Bijin", "Otanoshimi wa Korekara..."	Iyo Matsumoto	Gekka Bijin
1985	"Dokuritsu Sengen"	Iyo Matsumoto	Pony Tail wa Nusubanai
1985	"Nantetatte Idol"	Kyoko Koizumi	Nantetatte Idol
1985	"Yokosuka Day Dream"	Kyoko Koizumi	Today's Girl
1985	"Flapper", "Someday"	Kyoko Koizumi	Flapper
1985	"Debut: Fly me to love"	Naoko Kawai	Debut: Fly me to love
1985	"I'm in love"	Naoko Kawai	Lavender Lips
1985	"Oriental Eyes (Sometimes, Somewhere)", "Eien no Cinema House (Thousands Frames)"	Naoko Kawai	Stardust Garden
1985	"Kishuu"	Naoko Ken	Kishuu
1985	"Kanashii Opera", "Kakashi"	Naoko Ken	Deep
1985	"Imagination", "Communication", "1984", "Reaching Out"	Junko Yagami	Communication
1985	"Gold Wind"	Youko Nagayama	Gold Wind
1985	"Kill", "Yabanna Shuumatsu"	Shibugakitai	Kill
1985	"Moon Venus"	Shibugakitai	Moon Venus
1985	"Kibun wa New Orleans", "One More Night", "Namida no Amtrak"	Shibugakitai	Burrow Gag from New San Francisco
1985	"Tsumi Daze! New York", "Kanashimi no Kageki", "Good-bye Hollywood", "Otosareta China Town"	Shibugakitai	Exotic
1985	"Transformer"	Satoko Shimonari	Transformer
1985	""Moete Hero" (燃えてヒーロー)"	Takayuki Takemoto	Moete Hero
1985	""Hadashi no Soldier" (裸足のソルジャー)"	Kōsuke Shimoyama	Hadashi no Soldie
1986	"Mind Game", "Mosaic no Shiro", "Pink Champagne", Exotica", "Jealous Candle"	Akina Nakamori	Crimson
1986	"Yuujou no Monogatari"	Toshihiko Tahara	Hard ni Yasashiku
1986	"Friendly you", "Utsukushiki Grotesque"	Kyoko Koizumi	Hard ni Yasashiku
1986	"Tasogare no Monologue"	Miki Imai	Tasogare no Monologue
1986	"Melting Point", "Hitomi ni I love you	Yoko Oginome	Non-Stopper
1986	"Venus"	Youko Nagayama	Venus (sg)
1986	"Sushi Kuinee!"	Shibugakitai	Sushi Kuinee!
1986	"Koufuku no One Eight Ticket"	Shibugakitai	Tonde Hi ni Haire Natsu no Reijou
1986	"Arabian Kiss Club"	Shibugakitai	Arabian Kiss Club
1986	"Ano Koro no Oretachi"	Shibugakitai	Koibitotachi no Bldv.
1986	"Summer Night Carnival", "Manatsu no Dekigoto", "Hatachi no Pinocchio", "City"	Shibugakitai	Passionate Paradise
1986	"Poo-side Clash", "Andromeda no Namida", "Youki na Holy Night"	Shibugakitai	Horoscope
1986	"City Dreams From Tokyo", "Madness"	Hideki Saijo	From Tokyo
1986	"Transformer 2010"	Shō Hirose	Transformer 2010
1986	"Anime ja Nai – Yume o Wasureta Furui Chikyūjin yo" (アニメじゃない〜夢を忘れた古い地球人よ〜), "Jidai ga Naiteiru" (時代が泣いている)	Masahito Arai	Anime ja Nai – Yume o Wasureta Furui Chikyūjin yo
1987	"Star", Moshi Mouichido Aerunara	Yui Asaka	Star
1987	"Escape no Natsu"	Yui Asaka	Hitomi ni Storm
1987	"To be late"	Yui Asaka	Rainbow
1987	"Nanamena Ai wo Yurushite"	Miho Nakayama	50/50
1987	"Bad Boy"	Miho Nakayama	Catch Me
1987	"Liberty Girl", "Okkochai na Randevouz", "Linne Magic"	Miho Nakayama	One and Only
1987	"U Bu"	Kyoko Koizumi	Kyouko no Kiyoku Tanoshiku Utsukushiku
1987	"Sleepless Heart", "Odosarete..."	Junko Ohashi	Question
1987	"Lonely Liar"	Yu Hayami	Lonely Liar
1987	"Makkana Miniskirt"	Onyanko Club	Circle
1987	"Killer Toori ga Mainichi Party", "Babylon A Go Go", "Shonen no Saigo no Natsu", "Wangan Taiyōzoku (version II)", "Karuizawa Collection"	Yoko Oginome	Route 246 Connexion
1987	"Nile in blue"	Momoko Kikuchi	Nile in blue
1987	"Off Limits"	Momoko Kikuchi	Glass no Sougen
1987	"Dreamin' Rider", "Yokohama City of Lights", "Sundial"	Momoko Kikuchi	Escape from Dimension
1987	"Mister Monday", "Two of hearts, "I like you", "Sunny", "Papa Don't Preach", "Give me up"	Youko Nagayama	Venus (al.)
1987	"Tora! Tora! Tora!", "Yajuu no Bigaku"	Shibugakitai	Tora! Tora! Tora
1987	"Natsu no Mirage" (夏のミラージュ)	Kanako Wada	Natsu no Mirage
1987	"Orange Mystery" (オレンジ・ミステリー)	Hideyuki Nagashima	Orange Mystery
1987	"Yumeiro Chaser" (夢色チェイサー)	Mami Ayukawa	Yumeiro Chaser
1988	"Kanashimi no Tsubasa"	Yui Asaka	Cecile
1988	"Heartbreak Bay Blues", "All My Love"	Yui Asaka	Candid Girl
1988	"Sugar Baby Love", "Kaze no Prelude"	Wink	Sugar Baby Love
1988	"Dance with me", "Anata no Kata ni Hoho Umete "	Wink	Moonlight Serenade
1988	"Yumeiro Club"	Yoshie Kashiwabara	Aishita dake yo
1988	"Checking Out"	Yu Hayami	Get Up
1988	"In the room", "Megami no Migite"	Miki Matsubara	In the room
1988	all songs	Miki Matsubara	Wink
1988	"Superstition", "Suteki ni Fade Away"	Yoko Oginome	CD-Rider
1988	"Lonely Goodnight"	Youko Nagayama	Lonely Goodnight
1988	"Show Me", "Toy Boy", "I Think We Are Alone Now",	Youko Nagayama	Tokyo Menu
1988	"No Escape", "Atarashii Yesterday", "Lahaina no Kaze", "Akirakani Ai ni Natteta", "Bananafish no Hi", "Be-Song"	Youko Nagayama	F-1
1988	"I Should Go Away", "Once Again"	Hideki Saijou	33sai
1989	"Night Dancer"	Yui Asaka	True Love
1989	"Bandit", "White Nights"	Yui Asaka	Melody Fair
1989	"No to iu Aijou", "Anymore Ai Nante", "Bara Jikan", "Yoake no Metro"	Yoshie Kashiwabara	Yes I Love You: Unmei wo Koete
1989	"Sennen Roman", "Rhetorica"	Yoko Oginome	Fair Tension
1989	"Sukoshizutsu no Ai"	Noriko Sakai	Sayonara wo Sugite
1989	"All Right"	Noriko Sakai	All Right
1989	"Anata ni Home Sick", "100% no Koibito", "Koi to Ai no Nuance", "Blink", "Arigatou Heart Beat"	Noriko Sakai	My Dear/Noriko Part V
1989	"Bokura no Yume ni Yoroshiku" (ボクらの夢によろしく)	Cha-cha	Bokura no Yume ni Yoroshiku

=== 1990s–2000s ===
Show more

List of songs arranged for other artists, showing year released and album name
Year	Title	Artist(s)	Album/Single
1990	"Omatsuri Ninja"	Ninja	Omatsuri Ninja
1990	"Ressha"	Ninja	Ninja
1990	"Shake My Day", "Monalisa"	Hideki Saijo	Shake My Day
1990	"Yōshun no Passage" (陽春のパッセージ)	Yoko Yanaka	Yōshun no Passage
1990	""Zettai! Part 2"" (絶対!Part2)	Yoshie Hayasaka	Zettai! Part 2
1991	"Growing Up"	Hikaru Genji	Growing Up
1991	"Heart no Chikyuugi"	Hikaru Genji	333 (Thank You)
1991	"Ringo Hakusho"	Ninja	Ringo Hakusho
1991	"Ooi! Kurumayasan"	Ninja	Ooi! Kurumayasan
1991	"Overture (Festival Music)"	Ninja	Summer Fiesta
1991	"Gyakuten Typhoon", "Harahorohirehare"	Yoshie Hayasaka	Gyakuten Typhoon
1992	"Futari no Birthday"	Kohmi Hirose	Futari no Birthday
1992	"Yakusoku"	Hiroko Kasahara	Mou Ichido Love You
1993	"Yumemiru Planet"	Yoko Oginome	Yumemiru Planet
1994	"Kawaii Onna", "Yumemiru Chikara", "Mama wa Nandemo Shitteru"	Izumi Yukimura	I'm a Singer
1998	"Never Gonna Cry"	Misia	Mother Father Brother Sister
1998	"The Glory Day"	Misia	The Glory Day
1999	"One!	Misia	Wasurenai Hibi
2001	"Still Rain"	Nanase Aikawa	The Last Quarter
2001	"Nocturne"	Misia	Marvelous
2001	"Gaining Through Losing"	Ken Hirai	Gaining Through Losing
2001	"C'est la Vie"	Chemistry	The Way We Are
2002	"Treat or Goblins", "Anata no Kokoro ni"	Megumi Hayashibara	Treat or Goblins
2002	"Running Away"	Chemistry	Kimi wo Sagashiteta
2002	"Move on"	Chemistry	It Takes Two
2002	"Boku ga Chikyuu wo Sukuu: Sounds of Spirit"	Skoop On Somebody	Boku ga Chikyuu wo Sukuu: Sounds of Spirit
2003	"Flapper"	Smap	SMAP 016/MIJ
2003	"The Light: A Journey To The Promised Land"	Junpei Shiina	Amai Yoru no Kaori
2003	"Kokoro Hitotsu"	Misia	Kokoro Hitotsu
2004	"Eyes on me", "Diamond"	Misia	Mars & Roses
2004	"Fuyu no Etranger"	Misia	Singer for Singer
2004	"My Rivets"	Chemistry	OnexOne
2005	"For Isla Bonita"	Kaori Natori	Darling
2006	"Stay"	Kaori Natori	Stay
2006	"Hitosuji no Kiseki"	Gospellers	Hitosuji no Kiseki
2009	"Standing bird", "Get Ready, "XYZ", "Let Me Be Myself", "Deep Breathing", "Welcome to my fan club", "Hate me hate you", "Paranoia", "Your Rock", "Heart&Soul"	May'n	Styles

=== 2010s–2020s ===
Show more

List of songs written for other artists, showing year released and album name
Year	Title	Artist(s)	Album/Single
2010	"Ave Maria 2010"	Yoko Takahashi	Doukoku he no Monologue
2010	"Shuuketsu no Sadame", "Kyou no Hi wa Sayonara: Maternal Version"	Megumi Hayashibara	Shuuketsu no Sadame
2010	"Kiss of life"	Ken Hirai	Urauta Baka
2010	"Ai wa Furu Hoshi no Gotoku" (愛は降る星のごとく)	May'n	Ai wa Furu Hoshi no Gotoku
2010	"Shinjitemiru", "My Lovely Thing"	May'n	Shinjitemiru
2011	"Kioku"	Misia	Kioku
2011	"Soul Quest Overture", "This is me"	Misia	Soul Quest
2011	"Smile", "Mercy Mercy Me (The Ecology)", "This Christmas"	Misia	Misia no Mori: Forest Covers
2011	"Moshimo Kimi ga Negaunara", "Ai wa Furu Hoshi no Gotoku", "Phonic Nation"	May'n	If you...
2012	"Jewels"	May'n	Heat
2013	"Arigatou Okagesan", "Yume ga Hontou ni Naru Fune"	Harumi Miyako	Arigatou Okagesan
2013	"Lethe"	May'n	Yamai Dare Darlin'
2014	"Tomorrow"	Ken Hirai	Soredemo Shitai
2014	"Trickstar"	Iori Nomizu	Shikkoku wo Nuritsubuse
2015	"Mayonaka no Hide and Seek"	Misia	Shiroi Kisetsu
2015	"Orphans no Namida"	Misia	Orphans no Namida
2016	""Meimoku no Kanata" (瞑目の彼方)	Nagi Yanagi	Meimoku no Kanata
2017	"Who will know – furusato", "Tensions – welcome to the stage", "Who will know – snedronningen"	Yoko Takahashi	Welcome to the stage!
2018	"Come sweet death, second impact", "The Image of black me", "Dilemmatic triangle opera AYANAMI Version"	Megumi Hayashibara	Fifty-Fifty
2018	"Amazing Life"	Misia	Life is going on and on
2019	"Lifetime with..."	May'n	Yell
2020	"Kagayaki no Etude"	Sumire Morohoshi	Tsumuji Kaze
2022	"Wish"	Mika Nakashima	Wish
2023	"What If?"	Yoko Takahashi	Evangelion Eternally
2023	"The End", "Seiza"	Junna	Dear
