= Misia no Mori: Forest Covers =

Studio album by Misia
- Released: December 14, 2011
- Genre: Soul; Christmas; pop
- Length: 40:33
- Label: Ariola Japan
- Producer: Gomi; JP; Misia (exec.); Shirō Sagisu; Tohru Shigemi; Andrew Smith; Hiroto Tanigawa (exec.)

Misia chronology
Soul Quest (2011)	Misia no Mori: Forest Covers (2011)	Super Best Records: 15th Celebration (2013)

Misia no Mori: Forest Covers (MISIAの森(もり) -Forest Covers-, lit. "Misia's Forest") is the first covers album by Japanese singer Misia. It was released by Ariola Japan on December 14, 2011. The album consists of cover versions of songs by soul musicians, including Michael Jackson, Stevie Wonder, Marvin Gaye, among others, reworked Christmas standards and one newly recorded original song by Misia.

== Background and release ==
According to Misia, the idea for a covers album came about "naturally". She had recently covered "Can't Take My Eyes Off of You", and had been performing it on The Tour of Misia Japan Soul Quest tour, and over the summer she was offered the chance to record a cover version of the Charlie Chaplin classic "Smile" for the animated film Friends: Mononoke Shima no Naki, which Misia recorded with three children's choral groups from Sendai, one of the cities affected by the 2011 Tōhoku earthquake and tsunami. Misia felt that the best vehicle to release this material would be a covers album. With Japan still reeling from the aftermath of the March 11 events, she chose songs with an uplifting message and that felt relevant to the current climate, namely songs about hope, unity and the environment.

The title of the album refers to a real forest in Tsubata, Ishikawa that was named after Misia, as part of a project aiming to raise awareness on biodiversity conservation through on-location activities, music and art. A few songs off the album received commercial tie-ins; "What a Wonderful World" was used in commercials for Secom, and "Ōkina Ai no Ki no Shita de" in commercials for House Foods's Hokkaido stew seasoning mix, starring Rena Tanaka.

== Commercial performance ==
Misia no Mori: Forest Covers entered the daily Oricon Albums Chart at number 8, where it also peaked. It debuted at number 10 on the weekly Oricon Albums Chart, selling 13,000 copies on its first week. The album debuted one spot higher, at number 9, on the Billboard Japan Top Albums Sales chart. Misia no Mori: Forest Covers charted for nine weeks on the Oricon Albums Chart, selling a reported total of 29,000 copies during its run.

== Track listing ==
No.	Title	Writer(s)	Original artist	Length
1.	"Smile"	Charlie Chaplin; John Turner; Geoffrey Parsons	Nat King Cole	3:57
2.	"Heal the World"	Michael Jackson	Michael Jackson	5:07
3.	"The Rose"	Amanda McBroom	Bette Midler	3:22
4.	"What a Wonderful World"	Bob Thiele; George David Weiss	Louis Armstrong	2:50
5.	"Ribbon in the Sky" (Japanese Version)	Stevie Wonder; Misia	Stevie Wonder	4:24
6.	"Mercy Mercy Me (The Ecology)"	Marvin Gaye	Marvin Gaye	5:25
7.	"This Christmas"	Donny Hathaway; Nadine McKinnor	Donny Hathaway	3:55
8.	"White Christmas"	Irving Berlin	Bing Crosby	2:04
9.	"Can't Take My Eyes Off of You"	Bob Crewe; Bob Gaudio	Frankie Valli	6:19
10.	"Ōkina Ai no Ki no Shita de" (大きな愛の木の下で, "Under a Big Tree of Love")	Misia; Hinata; JP		3:10
Total length:				40:33

== Charts ==
Chart (2011)	Peak position
Japan Daily Albums (Oricon)	8
Japan Weekly Albums (Oricon)	10
Japan Monthly Albums (Oricon)	33
Japan Top Albums Sales (Billboard)	9

== Sales ==
Region	Certification	Certified units/sales
Japan	—	28,643
