= Deepness =

Single by Misia

from the album Super Best Records: 15th Celebration
- Released: November 7, 2012
- Studio: Rmt Studio
- Genre: R&B; pop
- Length: 4:43
- Label: Ariola Japan
- Songwriters: Misia; Jun Sasaki
- Producer: Misia

Misia singles chronology
"Koi wa Owaranai Zutto" (2012)	"Deepness" (2012)	"Back in Love Again" (2012)

Music video
- "Deepness" on YouTube

"Deepness" is a song recorded by Japanese singer Misia. It was co-written by Misia and Jun Sasaki and produced by Misia. "Deepness" was released as a single by Ariola Japan on November 7, 2012. It is the theme song to the TBS drama series Ōoku: Tanjō - Arikoto / Iemitsu-hen, starring Masato Sakai and Mikako Tabe.

== Background and release ==
"Deepness" was released close to five months after Misia's previous single, "Koi wa Owaranai Zutto". It is the first of two back-to-back singles, both servicing the soundtracks of two installments of the Ōoku franchise. It was released digitally in truetone format on October 12, 2012. The first pressing of the physical release came in digipak format and included the password to a secret Ustream broadcast of a mini concert held on December 19, 2012 to celebrate the release of the single. The single features the B-side "Koi Gram", written by Satoshi Shimano, as well as two remixes by DJ Gomi of the title track and of Misia's rendition of Michael Jackson's "Heal the World".

== Composition ==
"Deepness" is written in the key of B minor and set to a common time tempo of 77 beats per minute. Misia's vocals span from A_{3} to E_{5}. "Deepness" was written specifically for Ōoku: Tanjō. Before writing the song, Misia brushed up on the world of Ōoku by reading the original manga in its entirety. She was struck by the female shōgun and all-male ōoku, and felt that the reversal of gender roles depicted in the manga was something modern women could relate to. Misia decided to write lyrics that revolved around the dedication of the ōoku and the outpouring of love for their one and only shōgun.

== Critical reception ==
EMTG Music's Yūichi Hirayama stated about "Deepness" that "the message is in the sound of the song itself" and compared it to the "crisp" sound of Misia's "Snow Song" (2003). Hirayama described the song as being the "ideal vehicle" for Misia's voice. He also praised Phil Tan for his work mixing the track. CDJournal critics said the song was reminiscent of an Alicia Keys mid-tempo ballad and also praised Tan's contribution. They described "Deepness" as "epic" but not too overwhelming so as to put it on repeat.

== Music video ==
The music video for "Deepness" was directed by Sayaka Nakane and shot in early October 2012 in the Mongolian grassland. The video took four days to shoot to completion.

== Chart performance ==
"Deepness" made its chart debut on the weekly RecoChoku truetones chart at number 15. The song dropped six spots, down to number 21, on its second week. It moved up twelve spots to number 9 on its third week. On its fourth week, "Deepness" rose one spot to number 8. The song peaked on the truetones chart at number 6 the following week. "Deepness" debuted on the weekly RecoChoku singles chart at number 2, blocked from the top spot by Kana Nishino's record-breaking single "Always" (2012). "Deepness" entered the daily Oricon Singles Chart at number 14 and peaked at number 11. The single debuted at number 15 on the weekly Oricon Singles Chart, with 5,000 copies sold. It charted for ten consecutive weeks and sold a reported total of 12,000 copies during its run. "Deepness" peaked at number 10 on the Billboard Japan Hot 100, making it Misia's seventh top ten entry on the chart.

== Track listing ==
No.	Title	Writer(s)	Arranger(s)	Length
1.	"Deepness"	Misia; Jun Sasaki	Ichiro Suezawa	4:43
2.	"Koi Gram" (恋グラム, Koi Guramu, "Love Gram")	Satoshi Shimano	Shimano	3:59
3.	"Deepness" (Gomi's Lair Club Mix)	Misia; Sasaki	Gomi	5:09
4.	"Heal the World" (Gomi's Unity of Love Remix)	Michael Jackson	Gomi	4:47
Total length:				18:38

== Charts ==
Chart (2012)	Peak position	Sales
Japan Daily Singles (Oricon)	11	12,000
Japan Weekly Singles (Oricon)	15	12,000
Japan Hot 100 (Billboard)	10	12,000
Japan Adult Contemporary Airplay (Billboard)	43	12,000
Japan Hot Top Airplay (Billboard)	29	12,000
Japan Hot Singles Sales (Billboard)	12	12,000
Japan Weekly Singles (RecoChoku)	2	12,000
Japan Weekly Truetones (RecoChoku)	6	12,000
