= Ashita e =

Song by Misia

from the album Soul Quest
- Released: April 27, 2011 (Live Version)
- Recorded: April 8, 2011 (Live Version)
- Studio: Crescente Studio; RMT Studio
- Venue: NHK Hall (Live Version)
- Genre: Pop
- Length: 4:43 (Album Version); 5:11 (Live Version)
- Label: Ariola Japan
- Songwriters: Misia; Toshiaki Matsumoto
- Producer: Toshiaki Matsumoto

"Ashita e" (明日(あした)へ; lit. "Toward Tomorrow") is a song recorded by Japanese singer Misia, from her tenth studio album Soul Quest. A live version of the song was released as a charity single to benefit relief efforts following the 2011 Tōhoku earthquake and tsunami through Ariola Japan on April 27, 2011.

== Composition and release ==
After the events of the March 11, 2011 earthquake, Misia recalls feeling powerless and not knowing how to resume her music-related activities. After about a week, she found the motivation to resume touring and decided to set up a relief campaign called Hope for Japan through the non-profit organization Mudef. With a few shows postponed for safety measures, Misia found herself with two to three unscheduled weeks. It is within that bracket of time that she wrote "Ashita e" with Toshiaki Matsumoto. On April 8, 2011, Misia held a concert, her third since resuming touring, at the NHK Hall as part of her The Tour of Misia Japan Soul Quest concert tour. Before performing "Ashita e", she addressed the audience:

Before resuming the tour, I put all my wishes together and wrote a song. I first sang this song in Hiroshima, the city of peace. Everyday, I hear about more people concerned for the future as they follow the coverage of events. I want to sing this song to lift up your spirits. Let's walk towards tomorrow together ... I wrote this song to convey this feeling. There's no studio version yet, but, I would like to record this performance and release it as a charity song.

Her live performance of "Ashita e" was recorded and released as a digital single, with proceeds going toward the Hope for Japan campaign. The live version was featured as ending theme to the ANN coverage program Tsunagarō! Nippon: Terebi ga Tsutaeta Koto, Tsutaetai Koto. "Ashita e" was eventually recorded in studio and released as the closing track to Soul Quest.

== Performances ==
Misia first performed the "Ashita e" on her first concert following the March 11 earthquake, on April 1, 2011 at the Alsok Hall in Hiroshima. This performance was uploaded to Misia's official YouTube channel four days later. Her May 4, 2011 performance was also later upload to the channel. On December 31, 2012, Misia performed "Ashita e" at Dune 40 of the Namib Desert in Namibia, with temperatures reaching 122 degrees Fahrenheit (50 degrees Celsius). The performance was broadcast live as part of a two-song medley on the 63rd NHK Kōhaku Uta Gassen, marking Misia's first appearance on the show. The performance style of "Ashita e" has evolved since Misia first performed the song, most notably with Misia ending the song with a sustained Tenor C, often for more than twenty seconds.

== Credits and personnel ==
Personnel

- Vocals – Misia
- Piano, synthesizer – Toshiaki Matsumoto
- Songwriting – Misia, Toshiaki Matsumoto
- Production – Toshiaki Matsumoto
- Bass – Hitoshi Watanabe
- Engineering, mixing – Masahiro Kawaguchi
- Engineering – Ken Nishi
- Mastering – Herb Powers Jr.
