= Kioku (Misia song) =

Single by Misia

from the album Soul Quest
- Released: May 25, 2011
- Studio: RMT Studio; Beethoven Studio; Eastcote Studios; Air Studios
- Genre: Orchestral pop
- Length: 5:11
- Label: Ariola Japan
- Songwriters: Misia; Gorō Matsui; BZ4U
- Producer: Shirō Sagisu

Misia singles chronology
"Edge of This World" (2010)	"Kioku" (2011)	"Koi wa Owaranai Zutto" (2012)

Music video
- "Kioku" on YouTube

Audio sample
- "Kioku": file; help

"Kioku" (記憶(きおく); lit. "Memory", stylized as "La Mémoire") is a song recorded by Japanese singer Misia for her tenth studio album, Soul Quest. It was released as the album's lead single by Ariola Japan on May 25, 2011. "Kioku" is the theme song to the EX drama series Iryū Sōsa, starring Takaya Kamikawa.

== Background and release ==
"Kioku" is Misia's first single in nearly a year and a half, since "Hoshi no Yō ni..." (2009). The single includes a duet between Misia and JP, titled "Kono Mama de Tonight", as well as a cover of the 1967 Frankie Valli song "Can't Take My Eyes Off You". The first pressing of the physical release features a remix of "Maware Maware" as bonus track.

== Composition ==
"Kioku" was co-written by Misia and Gorō Matsui, composed by Korean composer and record producer BZ4U and produced by Shirō Sagisu. The song is composed in the key of B-flat major and set to a common time tempo of 65 beats per minute. Misia's vocals span from F_{3} to E♭_{5} in modal voice, and up to G_{5} in head voice. TV Asashi producer Yumiko Miwa tasked Misia to write a song that would convey "hope and sympathy". Misia penned the lyrics to "Kioku" shortly following the 2011 Tōhoku earthquake and tsunami, and she describes thinking of recent events while writing the song.

== Critical reception ==
CDJournal critics describe the song as a "majestic and beautiful" piano ballad with an orchestral arrangement. Misia received acclaim for the "presence" of her vocal performance, with critics noting "Kioku" as an example of Misia "showing herself at her best", and for writing lyrics with a strong message.

== Music video ==
The music video for "Kioku" was directed by Electrotnik. It premiered on May 11, 2011 on Space Shower TV. The video features a collection of pictures of "fond memories", some submitted by fans through an online submission campaign set up by Misia's team. A picture of an infant Misia surrounded by her older brother and sister can be seen near the end of the video. A doll made of papier-mâché, animated in stop motion, also appears throughout the video.

== Chart performance ==
"Kioku" entered the daily Oricon Singles Chart at number 14, where it also peaked. The single debuted at number 21 on the weekly Oricon Singles Chart, with 6,000 copies sold. It charted for four weeks and sold a reported total of 8,000 copies during its run.

== Track listing ==
No.	Title	Writer(s)	Arranger(s)	Length
1.	"Kioku" (記憶, "Memory")	Misia; Gorō Matsui; BZ4U	Shirō Sagisu	5:11
2.	"Kono Mama de Tonight" (with JP) (このままでTonight, "This Way Tonight")	Matsui; JP; Brandon Fraley	Fraley	4:44
3.	"Can't Take My Eyes Off of You"	Bob Crewe; Bob Gaudio	Gomi	6:15
4.	"Kioku" (Instrumental)	BZ4U	Sagisu	5:10
Total length:				21:20

Limited edition bonus track
No.	Title	Writer(s)	Arranger(s)	Length
5.	"Maware Maware" (Gomi's Lair Club Remix)	Misia; JP	Gomi	7:14
Total length:				28:38

== Credits and personnel ==
Personnel

- Vocals – Misia
- Songwriting – Misia, Gorō Matsui, BZ4U
- Arrangement, production, percussion, conducting – Shirō Sagisu
- Piano – Yasuharu Nakanishi
- Drums – Eiji Shimamura
- Guitar – Takayuki Hijikata
- Bass guitar – Yasuo Tomikura
- Flute – Jonathan Snowden
- French horns – Richard Watkins, Nigel Black
- Orchestra – The London Studio Orchestra
- Soprano – Catherine Bott
- Alto – Deborah Miles-Johnson
- Tenor – Andrew Busher
- Bass – Michael George
- Engineering – Masahiro Kawaguchi, Shirō Sagisu, Philip Bagenal, Rupert Coulson
- Mixing – Eiji Uchinuma
- Mastering – Herb Powers Jr.

== Charts ==
Chart (2011)	Peak position	Sales
Japan Daily Singles (Oricon)	14	8,000
Japan Weekly Singles (Oricon)	21	8,000
Japan Hot 100 (Billboard)	22	8,000
Japan Adult Contemporary Airplay (Billboard)	12	8,000
Japan Hot Top Airplay (Billboard)	25	8,000
Japan Hot Singles Sales (Billboard)	24	8,000

== Release history ==
Region	Date	Format	Label
Japan	May 25, 2011	CD, digital download	Ariola Japan
Taiwan	June 3, 2011	CD	Sony Music Entertainment Taiwan
