= Hoshi no Yō ni... =

Single by Misia

from the album Just Ballade
- Released: December 16, 2009
- Studio: Sound City; RM Studio; Crescente Studio
- Genre: Pop; R&B
- Length: 4:59
- Label: Ariola Japan
- Songwriters: Misia; Sinkiroh

Misia singles chronology
"Aitakute Ima" (2009)	"Hoshi no Yō ni..." (2009)	"Edge of This World" (2010)

Music video
- "Hoshi no Yō ni..." on YouTube

Audio sample
- "Hoshi no Yō ni...": file; help

"Hoshi no Yō ni..." (星(ほし)のように…; lit. "Like the Stars...") is a song recorded by Japanese singer Misia, from her ninth studio album, Just Ballade. It was released simultaneously with the album on December 16, 2009, through Ariola Japan. "Hoshi no Yō ni..." is the theme song to the kaiju film Mega Monster Battle: Ultra Galaxy.

== Background and composition ==
"Hoshi no Yō ni..." was released merely a month after Misia's previous single, "Aitakute Ima", and is her first re-cut single. The song was written by Misia, composed by Sinkiroh and arranged by Tohru Shigemi. It is composed in the key of B minor and set to a common time tempo of 75 beats per minute. Misia's vocals span from A_{3} to C_{5} in modal voice, and to D_{5} in head voice. The song serves as theme song for the film Mega Monster Battle: Ultra Galaxy (2009). Misia's involvement with the Ultra Series came about in September 2009, when the main character, Ultraman, became a mascot for the Child Africa project of the non-profit organization Mudef, of which Misia is a board member.

The single includes a remix of "Hoshi no Yō ni...", of which an edited version is also featured on the film's soundtrack, that samples soundbytes of Ultraman's trademark "Shuwatch!" exclamations. The first pressing of the physical single came with a collector's figurine of Ultraman.

== Critical reception ==
CDJournal critics noted that, despite the collaboration with Ultraman seeming "incompatible at first glance", Misia succeeds at creating a "fantastic and fascinating" theme song that does the character of Ultraman justice. They praised the song for "oozing pathos" and for "tugging at the heart" with its strings arrangement.

== Music video ==
The music video for "Hoshi no Yō ni..." features the original Ultraman and several popular Ultra kaiju. It was directed by long-time collaborator Ukon Uemura and is the first music video produced by Tsuburaya Productions, the studio behind the Ultra Series.

== Chart performance ==
"Hoshi no Yō ni..." entered the daily Oricon Singles Chart at number 9, where it also peaked. The single debuted at number 18 on the weekly Oricon Singles Chart, with 5,000 copies sold. It charted for four weeks and sold a reported total of 6,000 copies during its run.

== Track listing ==
No.	Title	Writer(s)	Arranger(s)	Length
1.	"Hoshi no Yō ni..." (星のように…, "Like the Stars...")	Misia; Sinkiroh	Tohru Shigemi	4:59
2.	"Hoshi no Yō ni..." (Gomi's Ultra Legend Mix)	Misia; Sinkiroh	Gomi	9:14
3.	"Ultra X'mas"	Misia; Hinata; JP	JP	1:55
Total length:				16:08

== Credits and personnel ==
Personnel

- Lead vocals – Misia
- Songwriting – Misia, Sinkiroh
- Arrangement, piano – Tohru Shigemi
- Guitar – Masato Ishinari
- Strings – Gen Ittetsu Strings
- Engineering – Masahiro Kawaguchi, Ken Nishi
- Mixing – Shojiro Watanabe
- Mastering – Herb Powers Jr.

== Charts ==
Chart (2009)	Peak position	Sales
Japan Daily Singles (Oricon)	9	6,000
Japan Weekly Singles (Oricon)	18	6,000
Japan Hot 100 (Billboard)	8	6,000
Japan Adult Contemporary Airplay (Billboard)	8	6,000
Japan Hot Top Airplay (Billboard)	10	6,000
Japan Hot Singles Sales (Billboard)	27	6,000
