= Namae no Nai Sora o Miagete =

Single by Misia

from the album Singer for Singer
- Released: July 7, 2004
- Genre: Pop
- Length: 5:19
- Label: Rhythmedia Tribe
- Songwriters: Misia, Kōji Tamaki
- Producer: Tohru Shigemi

Misia singles chronology
"In My Soul/Snow Song from Mars & Roses" (2003)	"Namae no Nai Sora o Miagete" (2004)	"Luv Parade/Color of Life" (2006)

Music video
- "Namae no Nai Sora o Miagete" on YouTube

"Namae no Nai Sora o Miagete" (名前のない空を見上げて; lit. "Looking Up to the Nameless Sky") is the fourteenth single by Japanese recording artist Misia. It was released on July 7, 2004 as the first and sole single from Misia's sixth studio album Singer for Singer.

== Background ==
"Namae no Nai Sora o Miagete" was simultaneously released with the Hoshizora no Live II Constellation Misia 2003 concert DVD on Misia's twenty-sixth birthday. With only two tracks, "Namae no Nai Sora o Miagete" is one of Misia's shortest singles. In addition to the title track, the single also includes its instrumental version. It is Misia's sixth and last release issued in CCCD format. A campaign to win a trip to Kauai, Hawaii, where the artwork for the single cover was shot, was launched in July 2004 to celebrate the release of the single.

On the release day, Misia held a special concert open to her fan club members only where she performed the "Namae no Nai Sora o Miagete" accompanied by Tamaki himself. In January 2005, Tamaki self-covered the song with Misia providing back-up vocals during the choruses and released it as a B-side to his single "Aisaretai Dake sa." In April 2009, singer-songwriter Taeko Ōnuki recorded a cover of the song for her cover album Palette.

== Composition ==
"Namae no Nai Sora o Miagete"
A 27-second sample of the final chorus of "Namae no Nai Sora o Miagete," featuring both Misia and Kōji Tamaki.

"Namae no Nai Sora o Miagete" was written by Misia, composed by Kōji Tamaki, and produced by Tohru Shigemi. CDJournal described the song as a "simple but powerful" medium-tempo ballad and complimented the collaboration between Misia and Tamaki. It served as theme song for the NHK morning drama Tenka, which aired from March to September 2004 for a total of 156 episodes. Tamaki explained in an interview that he composed the track with Misia in mind. In a press release, Misia commented:

When I first listened to Tamaki's demo tape, I was overcome by the gentle melody. It inspired me to write the lyrics to "Namae no Nai Sora o Miagete." I also had Tamaki provide back-up vocals for the choruses of the song, his voice gives me goosebumps every time I listen to it. As I hand it over to "Tenka," I can truly say I'm happy to have sung this song.

== Chart performance ==
"Namae no Nai Sora o Miagete" debuted on the Oricon Daily Singles chart at number 8 on July 6, 2004 and climbed to number 7 the following day. With 22,832 copies sold in its first week, the single peaked at number 9 on the Oricon Weekly Singles chart, becoming Misia's third consecutive and overall twelfth top ten hit. It charted for fifteen weeks and sold a total of 58,253 copies.

== Track listing ==
All lyrics are written by Misia; all music is composed by Kōji Tamaki.

No.	Title	Arranger(s)	Length
1.	"Namae no Nai Sora o Miagete" (名前のない空を見上げて "Looking Up to the Nameless Sky")	Tohru Shigemi	5:19
2.	"Namae no Nai Sora o Miagete (Instrumental)"	Shigemi	5:21
Total length:			10:45

== Charts, certifications and sales ==
=== Charts ===
Chart (2004)	Peak position
Oricon Daily Singles	7
Oricon Weekly Singles	9
Oricon Monthly Singles	18
Oricon Yearly Singles	166
SoundScan Japan Weekly Singles	9

=== Certifications and sales ===
Country	Certifications	Sales
Japan	Gold	58,253

== Release history ==
Region	Date	Format	Label
Japan	July 7, 2004	CD	Rhythmedia Tribe
Taiwan	July 14, 2004	CD	Avex Taiwan
