= Listen Up! The Official 2010 FIFA World Cup Album =

Compilation album by Various artists
- Released: 31 May 2010
- Recorded: 2010
- Genre: Dance-pop; latin pop
- Language: English; Portuguese; Fang; Duala; Xhosa
- Label: Epic
- Producer: Patrick Doyle; Benicio del Toro; Drew Barrymore; Dan Griffith; Goldie Hawn; Andrew Farriss

FIFA World Cup chronology
| Voices from the FIFA World Cup (2006) | Listen Up! The Official 2010 FIFA World Cup Album (2010) | One Love, One Rhythm (2014) |

Singles from Listen Up! The Official 2010 FIFA World Cup Album
- 1. "Waka Waka (This Time for Africa)" Released: 11 May 2010; 2. "Sign of a Victory" Released: 6 June 2010

Listen Up! The Official 2010 FIFA World Cup Album is a compilation album with various artists including both local African and international. This album is the official music album of the 2010 FIFA World Cup in South Africa and album was released on 31 May 2010.

== Background ==
The album consists of collaborations between Colombian singer Shakira and Freshlyground, "Waka Waka (This Time for Africa)", Nomvula, Claudia Leitte, R. Kelly, Pitbull. Japanese singer-songwriter Misia is the first Asian artist to participate in the worldwide edition of an official FIFA album. South African teacher, activist and singer Jpre contributes a revamp of his historical song, "Ke Nako" to the album. Originally recorded and adopted by Mr. Nelson Mandela as his election campaign "theme" song, the 2010 edition features Wyclef Jean, Jazmine Sullivan and B. Howard.

Proceeds from the album will benefit FIFA's "20 Centers for 2010", whose aim is to achieve positive social change through football by building twenty Football for Hope centres for public health, education and football across Africa, and other African charities.

== Critical reception ==
Professional ratings
Review scores
| Source | Rating |
|---|---|
| The Province | (C−) |

Canadian critic Stuart Derdeyn from The Province gave the album a C− and said "Red card for bad taste.[...] This leads to sonic vomit such as Shakira's "Waka Waka (This Time For Africa)," perhaps the stupidest official song for any major sporting event ever. At least the official "anthem" - "Sign of Victory" by R. Kelly and the Soweto Spiritual Singers - is somewhat listenable." Talent Haus fired back to Derdeyn's comments, saying "Calling a work of art from another culture 'vomit' is very disrespectful. Not having an open mind to other types of music that you don't hear in your country does not mean that a song won't be enjoyed globally, and the World Cup is a very global event."

== Track listing ==
International
| No. | Title | Performer(s) | Length |
|---|---|---|---|
| 1. | "Sign of a Victory" (The Official 2010 FIFA World Cup Anthem) | R. Kelly featuring Soweto Spiritual Singers | 4:13 |
| 2. | "Waka Waka (This Time for Africa)" (The Official 2010 FIFA World Cup Song) | Shakira featuring Freshlyground | 3:22 |
| 3. | "Viva Africa" | Nneka | 3:31 |
| 4. | "One Day" | Matisyahu featuring Nameless | 3:28 |
| 5. | "Shosholoza 2010" | Ternielle Nelson, Jason Hartman, Uju, Louise Carver, Aya & Deep Level | 3:42 |
| 6. | "Ke Nako" | B. Howard, Wyclef Jean, Jazmine Sullivan, J Pre | 4:04 |
| 7. | "Move On Up" | Angélique Kidjo and John Legend | 3:07 |
| 8. | "Spirit of Freedom" | Uju and Judy Bailey | 3:53 |
| 9. | "Game On" (The Official 2010 FIFA World Cup Mascot Song) | Pitbull, TKZee and Dario G | 3:19 |
| 10. | "Maware Maware" | Misia featuring M2J and Francis Jocky | 3:40 |
| 11. | "As Máscaras" (South Africa '10 to Brasil '14) | Claudia Leitte and Lira | 3:11 |
| 12. | "Hope" (with Nelson Mandela) | Siphiwo Featuring Message of Hope from Nelson Mandela | 3:50 |

Latin America and Spain Bonus Tracks
| No. | Title | Performer(s) | Length |
|---|---|---|---|
| 13. | "Gol De Mi Corazón" | Doctor Krápula | 3:08 |
| 14. | "Waka Waka (Esto Es África)" (Canción Oficial de La Copa Mundial FIFA 2010) | Shakira featuring Freshlyground | 3:22 |

South African Bonus Tracks
| No. | Title | Performer(s) | Length |
|---|---|---|---|
| 13. | "Nkosi Sikelel' Iafrika" | Soweto String Quartet |
| 14. | "Waka Waka (This Time for Africa) (Afro Fab mix)" (The Official 2010 FIFA World Cup Song) | Shakira featuring Freshlyground | 3:22 |

Asian Bonus Tracks
| No. | Title | Performer(s) | Length |
|---|---|---|---|
| 13. | "No. 1" | 2AM | 3:18 |
| 14. | "Roka Roka" | Shine | 3:51 |

== Charts ==
=== Weekly charts ===
| Chart (2010) | Peak position |
|---|---|
| Austria Albums Chart | 8 |
| European Top 100 Albums | 51 |
| German Albums Chart | 15 |
| Mexican Albums Chart | 6 |
| Mexican International Albums Chart | 3 |
| Swiss Albums Chart | 8 |
| U.S. Billboard Top Soundtracks | 18 |
| U.S. Billboard World Album Chart | 1 |

=== Year-end charts ===
| Chart (2010) | Position |
|---|---|
| Mexican Albums Chart | 82 |

== Release history ==
| Region | Date | Format | Label |
|---|---|---|---|
| Worldwide | 31 May 2010 | Standard edition (CD, digital) | Sony Music Entertainment |
| Canada | 1 June 2010 | CD Album | Sony Music Entertainment |
| France | 7 June 2010 | CD Album | Sony Music Entertainment |
| Japan | 9 June 2010 | CD Album | Sony Music Entertainment |

== See also ==
- FIFA World Cup songs and anthems
