= Francis Jocky =

- Origin: Cameroon
- Genres: Afro Pop, Dance Hall, Afrobeat
- Occupations: Singer, Song writer, Producer
- Years active: 1998–present

Francis Jocky is a singer, songwriter, and producer, born in Cameroon and moved to France at the age of 15. He learned to play the guitar at the age of 9 and by age 12 he played piano and started composing his first songs. He received his PhD in International Relations from Sorbonne University in Paris. During his studies, he regularly performed as a pianist and singer in various clubs in France and around the world. At one of his performances in Monte Carlo, he was approached by Jon Anderson who noticed his talent. The two wrote "The More You Know" in 1998. This record was released by Eagle Rock Entertainment.

He also got accolades from artists such as Stevie Wonder and Bono while sharing the microphone with them. In 2004, at the request of Eagle Rock Entertainment, he released under the name FJ & Living Souls the record 'Ambient Africa'. This record features vocal recordings from South African artists, recorded during the Apartheid by SABC. It held Number one positions for weeks on various radio stations in Canada and was featured in the Top 10 charts of US radio stations.

Francis Jocky released two solo records, 'Mr. Pain' and 'Sanctified'. In 2010, he collaborated with Japanese singer-songwriter Misia and DJ M2J on the track "Maware Maware" for Listen Up! The Official 2010 FIFA World Cup Album. The first performance of the song was before Japan and Cameroon's match in the 2010 FIFA World Cup.
