= Singer for Singer =

Studio album by Misia
- Released: December 8, 2004
- Recorded: 2004
- Genre: J-pop, R&B
- Length: 49:41
- Label: Rhythmedia Tribe; Avex Trax

Misia chronology
Misia Love & Ballads: The Best Ballade Collection (2004)	Singer for Singer (2004)	Ascension (2007)

Singer for Singer is Misia's sixth studio album and first conceptual one, released on December 8, 2004, only ten months after Mars & Roses. It sold 167,518 copies in its first week and peaked at #3. Singer for Singer features collaborations with Toshinobu Kubota, Fumiya Fujī, Glay, Chara, Kazufumi Miyazawa (The Boom), Eisho Higa (Begin) and Kōji Tamaki.

The album is certified Platinum for shipment of 250,000 copies.

== Track listing ==
No.	Title	Lyrics	Music	Length
1.	"Let It Smile" ("Toyota Wish" CM song)	Misia	Toshinobu Kubota	5:35
2.	"Hoshizora no Katasumi de (星空の片隅で, In the Corner of the Starry Sky)" (Fuji TV drama "Minna Mukashi wa Kodomo Datta" theme song)	Fumiya Fujī	Fumiya Fujī	5:39
3.	"Fuyu no Etranger (冬のエトランジェ, Fuyu no Etoranje, Stranger of Winter)" (Movie "Umineko" theme song)	Takuro	Takuro	4:24
4.	"Mama Says"	Chara	Chara	4:35
5.	"Kimi Dake ga Inai Sekai (君だけがいない世界, A World Without You)"	Kazufumi Miyazawa	Kazufumi Miyazawa	4:01
6.	"Birthday Cake"	Eisho Higa	Eisho Higa	4:58
7.	"Niji no Lalala (虹のラララ, Lalala of the Rainbow)"	Misia	Kōji Tamaki	4:24
8.	"Kaze no Nai Asa Hoshi no Nai Yoru (風のない朝 星のない夜, Windless Morning, Starless Night)"	Kazufumi Miyazawa	Kazufumi Miyazawa	5:11
9.	"Namae no Nai Sora o Miagete (名前のない空を見上げて, Looking Up At the Nameless Sky)" (NHK serial drama "Tenka" theme song)	Misia	Kōji Tamaki	5:14
10.	"Holy Hold Me"	Misia	Toshinobu Kubota	5:40

== Charts ==
=== Oricon sales chart ===
Release	Chart	Peak position	First day/week sales	Sales total
December 8, 2004	Oricon Daily Albums Chart	3		
December 8, 2004	Oricon Weekly Albums Chart	3	167,518	369,548
December 8, 2004	Oricon Yearly Albums Chart	36		
