= Muro (DJ) =

Japanese hip hop producer/DJ

- Also known as: King of Diggin, DJ XXXL
- Born: Takayoshi Murota; March 25, 1970 (age 56); Kawaguchi, Saitama Prefecture
- Origin: Japan
- Genres: Hip hop, funk
- Occupations: Rapper; DJ; record producer; designer
- Years active: 1987–present
- Label: King of Diggin'

Takayoshi Murota (室田 隆義, Murota Takayoshi; born March 25, 1970, in Kawaguchi, Saitama Prefecture), better known by his stage name Muro, is a Japanese hip hop recording artist, DJ, record producer and designer. In 1987 DJ Krush, Microphone Pager, Twigy and others formed the "Krush Posse", a crew of rappers and DJs. During this time he excelled at DJing hip-hop and began producing hip-hop beats. His solo debut appeared 1993. In the late 1990s he worked extensively with Nitro Microphone Underground, one of Japan's most successful hip-hop crews. In addition to producing he also was active as a designer.

== Discography ==
=== Singles ===
- "Street Life" (1994/4/21)
- "The Vinyl Athletes" (1999/12/22)
- "El Carnaval" (2000/7/5)
- "Lyrical Tyrants from Local to Global" (2001/1/24)
- "Space Funk 2001" feat. Nipps

=== Albums ===
- K.M.W. (King Most Wanted) (1999/4/21)
- Pan Rhythm: Flight No.11154 (2000/8/23)
- Incredible!-Bluenote DJ Mix by Muro (remix) (2001/5/23)
- King of Diggin' presents…Sweeeet Baaad A＊s Encounter (2002/6/12)
- Chain Reaction (mini album) (2003/1/22)
- Back II Back (best of album) (2004/3/10) (CCCD)
- Back II Back 2 (best of album) (2004/8/25) (CCCD)
- 20 Street Years Instrumentals Non Stop Mixed by DJ Muro (remix) (2005/7/20)
- 20 Street Years (2005/7/20)
- Muro Murotimate Breaks&Beats Vol.1 (best of album) (2006/11/22)
- Muro Murotimate Breaks&Beats Vol.2 (best of album) (2006/11/22)
- Tokyo Tribe 2 (soundtrack) (2006/11/22)
- Diggers Dozen (12 nippon gems selected by DJ Muro) (2022-BBE Music)

=== Featured on ===
- "Misia"「つつみ込むように…」 (1998/2/21)
- "つつみ込むように…" (DJ Watarai Remix～featuring Muro)
- Zeebra "Based on a True Story" (2000/6/14)
- "The Untouchable III" featuring Muro
- "Rino Latina II Carnival of Rino" (2001/12/5)
- "病む街 PartII 第三章" feat. Muro, Twigy
- "キングギドラ「最新兵器」" (2003/10/8)
- "リアルにやる" (Muro Remix)
- Nitro Microphone Underground "Straight from the Underground" (2004/8/25)
- "10%無理" featuring Muro
- "マボロシ「ワルダクミ」" (2004/12/8)
- "Set It Off" featuring Muro, Dabo
- "Mikris"「M.A.D.」 (2005/10/5)
- "Off the Chain" feat Muro, TAD'S A.C
- DJ Masterkey "The Adventures of Daddy's House" (2006/6/7)
- "Rhyme Line" feat Muro & Boo
- Kashi Da Handsome "Dime Pieces" (2007/3/7)
- "All★Star" feat Muro, Lunch Time Speax
- "Patch Up the Pieces" ft. Freddie Foxxx & DJ Muro (Album: DJ Babu Presents Duck Season)
- DJ Cam - "Honeymoon, Muro-Han-Tome"

=== M2J ===
- "Maware Maware" - Released under the alias M2J (a duo made up of DJ Muro and John Paul "JP" Lam)
