= DJ Gomi =

- Also known as: Gomi
- Born: October 31, 1967 (age 57); Chino, Nagano, Japan
- Genres: House; dance; disco
- Occupation(s): Disc jockey, record producer, songwriter
- Labels: Rhythmedia Tribe; Nippon Columbia; Defected Records; Gomination
- Website: DJGomi.com

Kazuhiko Gomi (born October 31, 1967), also known as Gomi or DJ Gomi, is a Japanese record producer and songwriter, based in New York.

== Biography ==
Gomi graduated from the Berklee College of Music after moving to Boston in 1989. He worked alongside Satoshi Tomiie in 1991 and Junior Vasquez in 1993 as music programmer and has produced remixes for international artists such as Mariah Carey, Madonna, Janet Jackson, Whitney Houston and Celine Dion. In Japan, he is best known for his frequent collaborations with Misia, for whom he has composed, produced and remixed songs since 2001.

In 2010, Gomi started his own record label called Gomination.

== Discography ==
=== Albums ===
- Neo Maestro (2002)
- Neo Maestro II (2003)
- Neo Maestro EV: Gomi's NYC Beats (2004)
- DJ Gomi Presents I Love NY House (2004)
- Catalyst (2008)

=== Singles ===
- "Good Music For Good People" (1996)
- "Hot Nights" (2006)
- "Glad I Found You" (2007)
- "Everything (Japanese Ver.)" (2008)
