= Misia =

Japanese singer-songwriter (born 1978)

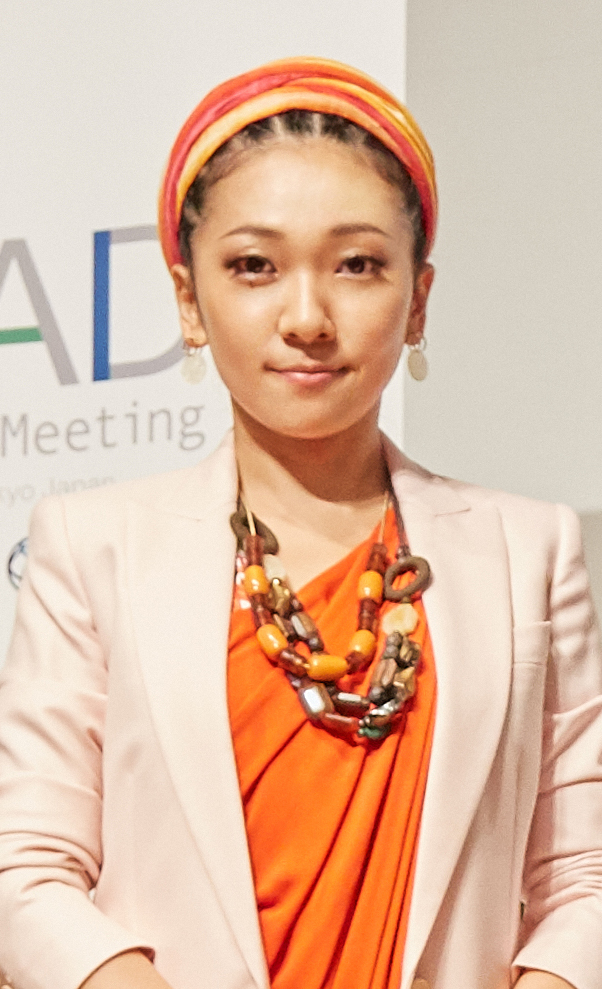
- Misia in 2018

Background information
- Born: Misaki Itō; July 7, 1978 (age 48); Tsushima, Nagasaki, Japan
- Genres: R&B; pop; soul jazz
- Occupation: Singer
- Years active: 1997–present
- Labels: Arista Japan; BMG Japan; Rhythmedia Tribe; Ariola Japan
- Website: misia.jp

Misaki Itō (伊藤 美咲, Itō Misaki) commonly known as Misia (ミーシャ, Mīsha; born July 7, 1978) and stylized in all caps, is a Japanese singer and songwriter. Born in Tsushima, Nagasaki, Misia moved to Fukuoka at the age of 14 to pursue a recording career. There, she continued her secondary education and briefly attended Seinan Gakuin University before withdrawing to focus on her musical career. She was signed to BMG Japan in 1997, after auditioning for record producer Haruo Yoda.

Misia came to prominence following the release of her debut album, Mother Father Brother Sister (1998), which became the seventh best-selling Japanese debut album of all time, earning her two Japan Gold Disc Awards and one Japan Record Award. In 2000, Misia released her sophomore album, Love Is the Message, which earned her another Japan Gold Disc Award and Japan Record Award. Her third studio album, Marvelous (2001), spawned her first number-one single on the Oricon singles chart, "Everything". The song became one of the best-selling singles of all time in Japan, and is the third best-selling physical single by a Japanese solo female artist of all time.

In 2001, Misia and her management, Rhythmedia, signed a recording contract with Avex and formed their own label, Rhythmedia Tribe. Her first album under Rhythmedia Tribe, Kiss in the Sky, became Misia's fourth consecutive number-one album on the Oricon albums chart. In doing so, Misia became the fourth solo female artist with the longest streak of number-one albums since their debut. Following a series of successful records, including Mars & Roses, Singer for Singer and Ascension, Misia returned to her former record label, BMG Japan. After Sony Music Entertainment Japan's acquisition of BMG Japan, Misia relocated to the Sony subsidiary, Ariola Japan.

Misia has released thirteen studio albums and is among the all-time best-selling Japanese music artists, having sold more than 20 million records. She is one of the top-touring artists in Japan, becoming the first female artist to play all five of Japan's largest stadiums in 2004. Besides her musical career, Misia is also a committed philanthropist and involves herself in humanitarian causes and biodiversity conservation activities.

== Biography ==
=== Early life ===
Misia was born on July 7, 1978, to parents who were both doctors. BusinessWeek reported in 2002 that her real name was Misaki Ito (伊藤美咲, Ito Misaki) though her official site lists only her stage name. Her father loved jazz, and her mother is Ryukyuan, and loved Western music. Originally both her parents studied vocal music.

She grew up in Tsushima, Nagasaki.

She gradually came to want to leave Tsushima, where she was not able to get enough information about music, and wanted to take voice lessons in earnest in Fukuoka. Subsequently, she left her home and moved to Fukuoka with her elder sister where she attended high school. During junior high and high school she sang and played the trumpet in the brass band club.

While going to the high school, she also began to go to a music academy and met two Black American vocal trainers there while she was in the eleventh grade. She began training with them in gospel and R&B. In April 1997, she was accepted into Seinan Gakuin University in commercial science.

=== Career beginnings ===
In May 1997, Misia finally passed a BMG Japan audition to find a soulful female R&B singer. Misia sang "Goodbye Darlin'" by Dreams Come True and was chosen from about 3,000 candidates. She decided to pursue a music career instead of school education and took a leave of absence from university. Her perception of the image of an R&B singer is hair styled in dreadlocks, so she styled her own hair that way that November. She used the stage name "MISIA" at the beginning of her music career.

=== Establishing her popularity: 1998–2002 ===
Misia debuted on February 21, 1998, with "Tsutsumikomu Yō ni..." which peaked at number 11 on the Oricon single charts.

Her second single "Hi no Ataru Basho" reached number 9 and was used in the soundtrack of the movie Hood. Her first album, Mother Father Brother Sister, was released on June 24, 1998, entering the charts at number 3 and reaching number 1 after 4 weeks. In March 1999, she won Best New Artist of the Year and Best Pop Album of the Year at the Japan Gold Disc Awards.

Misia's second album, Love Is the Message was released on January 1, 2000, which went on to sell over 2 million copies. In October of the same year she released her most well-known song "Everything", which sold nearly 1.9 million copies.

In 2001, one of Misia's dreams came true with the release of "I Miss You (Toki o Koete)", a collaboration with Dreams Come True, her favorite band. She and Masato Nakamura, the leader of DCT, created the music while Misia wrote the lyrics. The single was released on January 1, 2001.

=== Avex Trax: 2002–2007 ===
In 2002, she transferred to a new record label, Rhythmedia Tribe, affiliated with Avex Group.

Her single "Kokoro Hitotsu" released on August 27, 2003, was used as the theme song to the hit movie Dragon Head.

The single "Namae no Nai Sora o Miagete", released on July 7, 2004, was used as the theme song for the drama Tenka. "Tobikata o Wasureta Chiisana Tori" is used as the theme song of the PlayStation 2 role-playing game Star Ocean: Till the End of Time and also appears within the game as an orchestral arrangement. Also, "Sea of Dreams" was used as the Tokyo DisneySea 5th Anniversary theme song.

Misia became the first female solo act to tour the five major dome stadiums of Japan (Tokyo Dome, Nagoya Dome, Osaka Dome, Sapporo Dome and Fukuoka Dome) in 2004, drawing 357,000 spectators in seven performances.

=== Return to BMG Japan: 2007–present ===
It was announced on May 1, 2007, that Misia had left Avex Trax to return to her former record label, BMG Japan. "Any Love" was released on July 4, 2007; the song was composed by Satoshi Shimano, who also produced her debut hit.

Her song "To Be in Love" is the Japanese theme song to Bridge to Terabithia.

On September 29, 2007, Misia held her first overseas concert, in Taiwan.

Her next single, "Royal Chocolate Flush", was released in December 2007, and the first album since returning to BMG, Eighth World, came out in January 2008.

Ichiro Suzuki (Seattle Mariners), a major league player, chose "Ishin Denshin" and "Royal Chocolate Flush" by Misia as an at-bat music of 2008 with Sayuri Ishikawa's "Amagi-goe".

In May 2008, Misia joined Sadao Watanabe, Juanes, Youssou N'Dour, and Bono for the 'One For All' event on May 29, 2008, for 1,500 in Yokohama, Japan.

Misia put out three new releases from April to June 2008: Yes Forever in April, "Yakusoku no Tsubasa" in May, and Decimo X Anniversario de Misia: The Tour of Misia 2008 Eighth World + The Best DJ Remixes in June.

In continuation of her 10th anniversary celebration, Misia released her first digital single, "Catch the Rainbow" (produced by Sakoshin) on August 30, 2008.]

She wrapped up The Tour of Misia Discothèque Asia in early March, a tour that brought her to Seoul, Singapore, Hong Kong and Shanghai and opened her eyes to the different responses of crowds as she noted "In Japan, it is like people are melting into one group in their excitement, but in Singapore young couples started to kiss. I often see Japanese couples hand-in-hand, but it is rare to see them showing they love each other in front of others."

In 2008, Misia drew near more than 200,000 spectators, second only to Ayumi Hamasaki in the number of concert-goers for a solo female artist in Japan.

The June 2009 single "Ginga/Itsumademo" was inspired by Misia visiting her grandfather for the last time before his death, for which she stated upon its release, "I thanked him for taking me out for a walk when I was a child, for teaching me how to fold origami and make shadow pictures, and for telling me stories. I couldn't stop saying thank you." This and her later single "Hoshi no Yō ni...", which was used as the theme song for the film Mega Monster Battle: Ultra Galaxy were included on Misia's 9th studio album Just Ballade.

Misia's 2010 tour titled "Hoshizora no Live VI" included performances in the open air and within forests in order to raise awareness of biodiversity and to support her anthropological work.

For the 2010 FIFA World Cup in South Africa, Misia recorded the song "Maware Maware" and performed it at Nelson Mandela Square in Johannesburg before the Japan vs Cameroon game. She was also inspired by the International Year of Biodiversity and wrote the song "Life in Harmony", eventually chosen by the Convention on Biological Diversity to be the song for the conference.

In 2011, Misia returned to recording with the song "Ashita e" to raise money for victims of the 2011 Tōhoku earthquake and tsunami and "Kioku", Misia's first official single in nearly a year and a half. These songs, along with "Maware Maware" and "Life in Harmony" were included on Misia's 10th studio album Soul Quest. She followed up Soul Quest with the cover album Misia no Mori: Forest Covers, which includes a cover of Charlie Chaplin's "Smile" which is used as the theme song for the film Friends: Mononokejima no Naki.

In 2012, Misia was invited to perform at the opening ceremonies of the 100th anniversary of the National Cherry Blossom Festival in Washington, D.C., where she sang her songs "Everything", "Ashita e", and a medley of "Maware Maware" and "Can't Take My Eyes Off You". Misia stated that she hoped that her appearance at the concert would re-invigorate the bond between the U.S. and Japan to help with the reconstruction from the 2011 earthquake. Misia performed at the 63rd NHK Kōhaku Uta Gassen in a live broadcast from Namibia's Namib Desert singing "Everything" and "Ashita e".

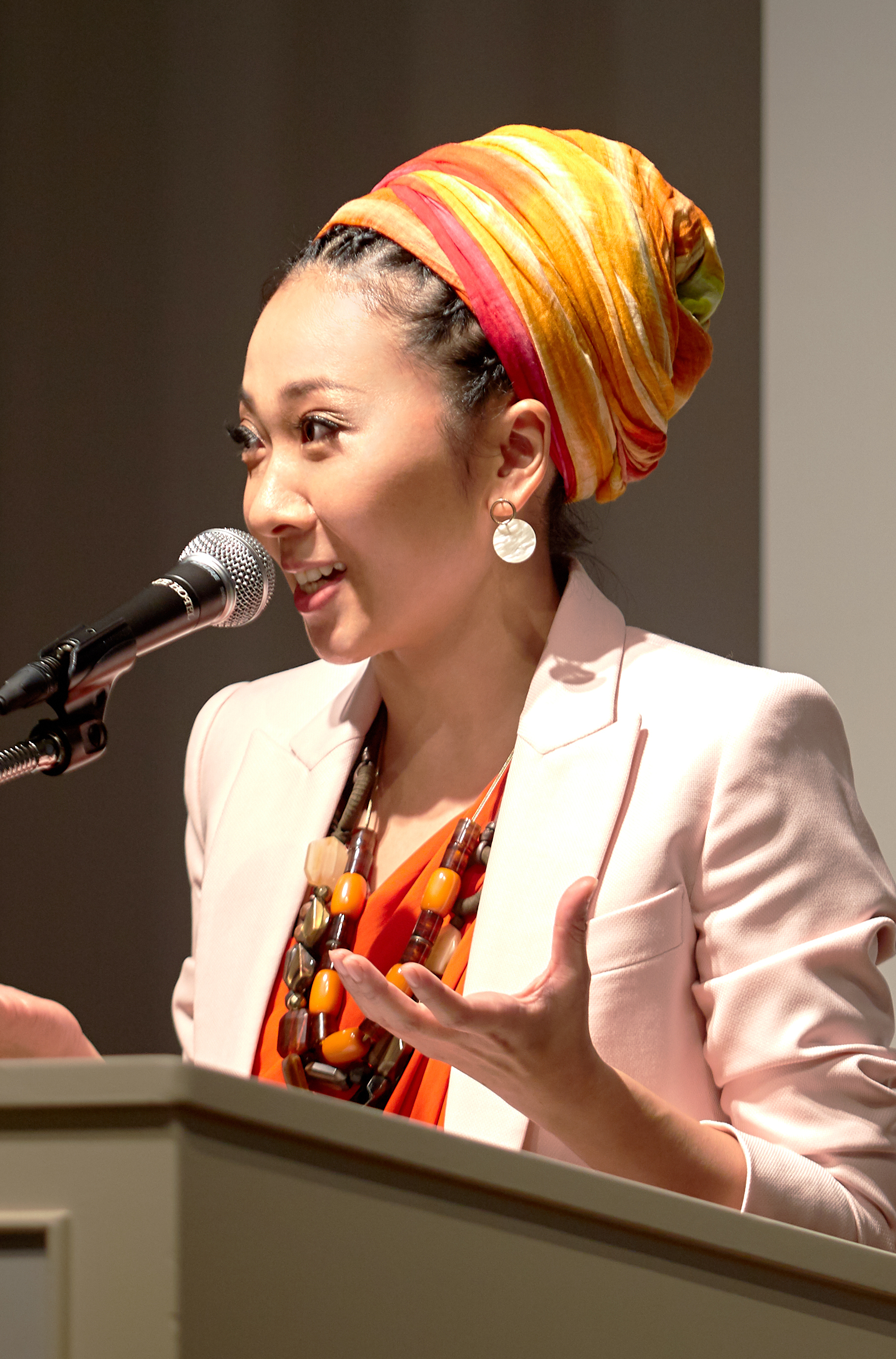
Misia at the TICAD conference in Tokyo, October 2018

In 2013, Misia released a 15th anniversary triple album Super Best Records: 15th Celebration, featuring 45 remastered tracks which includes the singles "Koi wa Owaranai Zutto", "Deepness", and "Back in Love Again", along with the new track "Holiday". Misia and Sony also released an accompanying Blu-ray box set titled THE TOUR OF MISIA BOX Blu-ray 15th Celebration, containing 11 disks, ten of which were Blu-ray editions of her previous DVDs and the 11th being a remastered Blu-ray release of her first tour VHS.

In 2020, Misia made another international appearance on the eighth season of Hunan TV's reality singing competition Singer, along with four previously contested singers from seasons four to six, and along with new singers Mao Buyi and Zhou Shen. Misia made it to the finals aired April 24.

On July 23, 2021, sang the Japanese anthem at the opening of the 2020 Olympics.

On December 30, 2021, Misia won the Best Vocal Performance award at the 63rd Japan Record Awards.

== Philanthropic work ==
Misia began getting involved in fund-raising in 2002 and went on to visit Kenya, Mali, and Malawi, setting up the charity Child Africa. Child Africa holds exhibitions, benefit concerts, collects donations and provides help of educational specialists and advisers. Some of Misia's own tour merchandise available at her shows are made by people she has met on her visits to Kenya.

On March 1, 2010, Misia was appointed Honorary Ambassador for the 10th Meeting of the Conference of the Parties to the United Nations Convention on Biological Diversity (COP10) by the U.N. Secretary General. Her role was largely to raise awareness of the issues and she created a website titled Satoyama Basket to encourage education on the issue of biodiversity.

At her 2010 "Hoshizora no Live VI" tour, Misia produced a "Biodiversity Band" (a silicon bracelet) with profits going to the Secretariat of the Convention on Biological Diversity. The tour also included a biodiversity booth under the cooperation of the Japanese Ministry of the Environment.

During the 2010 World Cup, for which Misia contributed a song, she visited the "Football for Hope Center" to communicate with local children who received football lessons but also advice on HIV & AIDS.

In May 2010, Misia expanded her activities by establishing a foundation named "mudef" (Music Design Foundation) for which she is a board member. The principal aim of mudef is "to raise awareness on Millennium Development Goals (MDGs) to accelerate its accomplishment". Within eight major goals of MDGs that are to be met by 2015, the conservation of biodiversity and the achievement of universal primary school, her two major focuses, are included.

== Discography ==
- Mother Father Brother Sister (1998)
- Love Is the Message (2000)
- Marvelous (2001)
- Kiss in the Sky (2002)
- Mars & Roses (2004)
- Singer for Singer (2004)
- Ascension (2007)
- Eighth World (2008)
- Just Ballade (2009)
- Soul Quest (2011)
- Misia no Mori: Forest Covers (2011)
- New Morning (2014)
- Love Bebop (2016)
- Life Is Going On and On (2018)
- Hello Love (2021)
- Love Never Dies (2025)

== Filmography ==
- Sing (2017): Meena (Japanese voice)
- Sing 2 (2022): Meena (Japanese voice)

== See also ==
- List of best-selling music artists in Japan
