= Ariola Japan =

Japanese record label

- Parent company: Sony Music Entertainment Japan (2009–2014); Sony Music Labels Inc. (2014–present)
- Founded: 2009; 16 years ago
- Distributor: Sony Music Solutions
- Genre: Rock; pop; R&B
- Country of origin: Japan
- Official website: www.ariola.jp

Ariola Japan (アリオラジャパン, Ariora Japan), is a Japanese record label owned by Sony Music Labels Inc., a subsidiary of Sony Music Entertainment Japan. The label is the successor to BMG Japan and its former labels.

== History ==
In October 2008, BMG Japan became a subsidiary of Sony Music Entertainment Japan following Sony buying out BMG's share of Sony BMG. BMG Japan previously operated as a division of Sony BMG. In October 2009, Ariola Japan Inc. was founded, absorbing BMG Japan and its labels. Its namesake is from the main Ariola Records label. The record label continued to use BMG Japan's "BV" catalog code.

In 2014, Ariola Japan Inc. was absorbed by Sony Music Records Inc, changing its name to Sony Music Labels. Since the absorption, Ariola Japan has operated as an imprint of Sony Music Labels.

== Artists ==
It is home to both former BMG Japan artists and new artists, including:

- Asai Kenichi & the Interchange Kills
- Ema
- Ive (Japanese releases only)
- Okamoto's
- Oh My Girl (Japanese releases only)
  - Oh My Girl Banhana
- Qyoto
- Kep1er (Japanese releases only)
- King Gnu
- Coalamode.
- Sherbets
- Seikima-II
  - Demon Kakka
- Chehon
- Denpa Girl
- Bakarhythm
- Ken Hirai
- Boogieren
- Brainchild's
- Mashimaro
- Takako Matsu
- Yuuri

=== iDEAK ===
- Toshiki Kadomatsu

=== Little Tokyo ===
- Kazumasa Oda

=== Rhythmedia Tribe ===
- Misia

=== Happy Song Records ===
- The Cro-Magnons
- The High-Lows

== Former artists ==
- Aisha
- Ayano Mashiro
- AZU (managed by Avex)
- The Boyz (now with Universal Music Japan)
- Crossfaith
- Deen (managed by Being Inc.)
- fumika
- Hiromi Sakimoto
- NGT48
- NU'EST
- One Day (JYP Entertainment/Ariola Japan)
  - 2AM
  - 2PM
- Rake
- Sayuri
- Tatsuyuki Hiyamuta
  - DAD MOM GOD
- The Yellow Monkey
- Zeebra

=== Augusta Records ===
Joint venture with Office Augusta, which is now a subsidiary of Universal Music Japan

- Kyoko
- Yu Sakai
- Sukima Switch
  - Takuya Ohashi
- Motohiro Hata
