= Super Best Records: 15th Celebration =

Greatest hits album by Misia
- Released: February 20, 2013
- Recorded: 1997–2012
- Genre: R&B; pop; hip hop; soul; dance
- Length: 3:47:22
- Label: Ariola Japan
- Producer: Hiroto Tanigawa (exec.)

Misia chronology
Misia no Mori: Forest Covers (2011)	Super Best Records: 15th Celebration (2013)	New Morning (2014)

Singles from Super Best Records: 15th Celebration
- 1. "Koi wa Owaranai Zutto" Released: June 20, 2012; 2. "Deepness" Released: November 7, 2012; 3. "Back in Love Again" Released: December 19, 2012

Super Best Records: 15th Celebration (stylized as Super Best Records -15th Celebration-) is the second greatest hits album by Japanese singer Misia. It was released to commemorate Misia's 15th anniversary as a recording artist by Ariola Japan on February 20, 2013, one day shy of her actual 15th anniversary. The three-disc set was released in Blu-spec CD2 format and each disc was remastered by a different music engineer. The compilation includes four reworked tracks, the singles "Koi wa Owaranai Zutto", "Deepness" and "Back in Love Again", and the new song "Holiday", which was released as a promotional single for the album.

== Background and release ==
After discussing the project with DJ Gomi, Misia first came up with the idea to spread the songs across three discs, each covering a different genre of song, namely uptempo, mid-tempo and ballad. The idea to ask different mastering engineers to produce each disc was also floated by during their discussion. Ultimately, Misia and her team decided on mixing genres to offer the listener a more balanced listening experience, but held on to the idea of tasking different engineers with a separate disc. In an interview with Natalie, Misia revealed that the song selection process took about three months to complete. The selected songs were assigned to each engineer based on their forte. Disc one, which mainly features bright and lively tracks, was remastered by Chris Gehringer, disc two, consisting mostly of ballads, was tasked to Herb Powers Jr., and the live instrument-focused disc three was handled by Tom Coyne.

In addition to the remastered songs, the compilation also includes reworked tracks. An updated version with new vocals, lowered a half-step, of Misia's debut single "Tsutsumikomu Yō ni...", produced by DJ Gomi and mixed by Goh Hotoda, kicks off disc one, which also features an EDM version of the single "Catch the Rainbow". Disc three includes two re-recorded tracks: "Into the Light" from The Glory Day EP, and "Ashita e".

The limited edition of the album comes with a DVD that details Misia's career progression through whiteboard animation and behind-the-scenes footage from music video shoots, concerts, and her charity work. Super Best Records: 15th Celebration was released simultaneously with The Tour of Misia Box Blu-ray: 15th Celebration, a Blu-ray box set of all ten concerts from The Tour of Misia series.

== Commercial performance ==
Super Best Records: 15th Celebration entered the daily Oricon Albums Chart at number two, with 22,000 copies sold on its first day. Two days later, the album rose to the top of the chart and stayed there for the remainder of the week. It debuted at number one on the weekly Oricon Albums Chart, selling 65,000 units and becoming Misia's first number-one album in over eight years, the first since Misia Love & Ballads: The Best Ballade Collection. The album also topped the Billboard Japan Top Albums Sales chart on its debut week. It fell to number five on the Oricon chart the following week, logging sales of 31,000 copies. It held on to the top ten for a third and last week, charting at number 8 and selling 15,000 copies. As of February 2017, Super Best Records: 15th Celebration has charted for seventy-nine non-consecutive weeks on the Oricon Albums Chart, selling a reported total of 167,000 copies during its run.

== Track listing ==
Disc One: Mastered by Chris Gehringer
No.	Title	Writer(s)	Album	Length
1.	"Tsutsumikomu Yō ni..." (15th Version)	Satoshi Shimano	Previously Unreleased	4:38
2.	"Deepness"	Misia; Jun Sasaki	Previously Unreleased	4:44
3.	"Koi wa Owaranai Zutto"	Misia; Sasaki	Previously Unreleased	4:36
4.	"Aitakute Ima"	Misia; Sasaki	Just Ballade	6:01
5.	"Snow Song"	Misia; Keith Crouch	Mars & Roses	5:04
6.	"To Be in Love"	Misia; Joi; Hiroshi Iihoshi	Eighth World	6:17
7.	"This Is Me"	Misia; Mike Wyzgowski; Shirō Sagisu	Soul Quest	4:00
8.	"Back Blocks"	Misia; Sakoshin	Kiss in the Sky	5:25
9.	"Color of Life"	Misia; Joi	Ascension	4:41
10.	"Royal Chocolate Flush"	Misia; Sakoshin; Shusui	Eighth World	3:56
11.	"Don't Stop Music!"	Misia; Tak Matsumoto	Kiss in the Sky	4:28
12.	"Back in Love Again"	Misia; Tomoyasu Hotei	Previously Unreleased	4:39
13.	"Hi no Ataru Basho"	Misia; Sasaki	Mother Father Brother Sister	4:55
14.	"Luv Parade"	Misia; Andreas Grill; Nick Malmeström	Ascension	4:13
15.	"Catch the Rainbow" (15th Version)	Misia; Sakoshin	Previously Unreleased	4:24
Total length:				1:12:06

Disc Two: Mastered by Herb Powers Jr.
No.	Title	Writer(s)	Album	Length
1.	"Everything"	Misia; Toshiaki Matsumoto	Marvelous	7:00
2.	"Sukoshi Zutsu Taisetsu ni"	Misia; Sinkiroh	Just Ballade	5:11
3.	"Wasurenai Hibi"	Misia; Toshiaki Matsumoto	Love Is the Message	5:41
4.	"Nemurenu Yoru wa Kimi no Sei"	Misia; Ken Matsubara	Kiss in the Sky	5:25
5.	"Soba ni ite..." (そばにいて…, "Stay by My Side")	Misia; Sinkiroh	Eighth World	5:00
6.	"Let It Smile"	Misia; Toshinobu Kubota	Singer for Singer	4:57
7.	"It's Just Love"	Misia; Shimano	Love Is the Message	5:33
8.	"Hoshi no Yō ni..."	Misia; Sinkiroh	Just Ballade	4:32
9.	"Edge of This World"	Misia; Sinkiroh	Soul Quest	4:27
10.	"Believe"	Misia; Sasaki	Love Is the Message	4:51
11.	"Taiyō no Malaika" (太陽のマライカ, Taiyō no Maraika, "Angel of the Sun")	Misia	Eighth World	4:50
12.	"The Glory Day"	Misia; Mash; Sagisu	The Glory Day	8:46
13.	"Maware Maware" (featuring M2J and Francis Jocky)	Misia; JP	Soul Quest	3:42
14.	"Itsumademo"	Misia; Sinkiroh	Just Ballade	1:31
15.	"Hatenaku Tsuzuku Story"	Misia; Toshiaki Matsumoto	Kiss in the Sky	6:28
Total length:				1:18:00

Disc Three: Mastered by Tom Coyne
No.	Title	Writer(s)	Album	Length
1.	"Into the Light" (15th Version)	Misia; Hiroshi Matsui	Previously Unreleased	6:54
2.	"Holiday"	Misia; Kenji Hayashida	Previously Unreleased	3:50
3.	"Taiyō no Chizu" (太陽の地図, "Map of the Sun")	Misia; Gomi; Shusui	Eighth World	4:53
4.	"Escape"	Misia; Sakoshin	Marvelous	4:57
5.	"Namae no Nai Sora o Miagete"	Misia; Kōji Tamaki	Singer for Singer	5:18
6.	"Chiheisen no Mukōgawa e" (地平線の向こう側へ, "Beyond the Horizon")	Misia; Sinkiroh	Just Ballade	4:12
7.	"Fuyu no Étranger" (冬のエトランジェ, Fuyu no Etoranje, "The Stranger of Winter")	Takuro	Singer for Singer	4:27
8.	"Tobikata o Wasureta Chiisana Tori" (飛び方を忘れた小さな鳥, "The Little Bird That Forgot How to Fly")	Misia; Yudai Suzuki	Kiss in the Sky	5:08
9.	"Kokoro Hitotsu"	Misia; Sagisu	Mars & Roses	4:40
10.	"Kiss Shite Dakishimete" (キスして抱きしめて, "Kiss and Hold Me")	Misia	Mother Father Brother Sister	5:10
11.	"Melody"	Misia; Matsui	The Glory Day	6:47
12.	"We Are the Music"	Misia; Toshiaki Matsumoto	Ascension	5:13
13.	"Life in Harmony"	Misia; yellowRubato	Soul Quest	5:02
14.	"Tsutsumikomu Yō ni..."	Shimano	Mother Father Brother Sister	5:46
15.	"Ashita e" (15th Version)	Misia; Toshiaki Matsumoto	Previously Unreleased	4:51
Total length:				1:17:16

Limited edition DVD
No.	Title	Length
1.	"Misia History: 15th Celebration"	48:38
Total length:		48:38

== Charts ==
Chart (2013)	Peak position
Japan Weekly Albums (Oricon)	1
Japan Monthly Albums (Oricon)	2
Japan Yearly Albums (Oricon)	36
Japan Top Albums Sales (Billboard)	1
Japan Top Albums Sales Year End (Billboard)	40

== Certifications ==
Region	Certification	Certified units/sales
Japan (RIAJ)	Platinum	197,000

== See also ==
- List of Oricon number-one albums
