= Misia Greatest Hits =

Greatest hits album by Misia
- Released: March 3, 2002
- Recorded: 1997–2002
- Genre: R&B, J-pop
- Length: 73:22
- Label: Arista Japan

Misia chronology
Misia Remix 2002 World Peace (2001)	Misia Greatest Hits (2002)	Kiss in the Sky (2002)

Misia Greatest Hits is Misia's first compilation album and last release with Arista Japan, released on March 3, 2002. It sold 587,210 copies in its first week and peaked at #1 for two consecutive weeks. Misia Greatest Hits was the highest selling compilation album of 2002. It is the 30th best selling compilation album and 90th best selling album overall of all time in Japan. The album includes an enhanced music video for the unreleased track, Amai Koibito, featuring Melonpan.

== Track listing ==
No.	Title	Lyrics	Music	Length
1.	"Tsutsumikomu Yō ni... (つつみ込むように…, Like Being Wrapped Up...)" (from Mother Father Brother Sister)	Satoshi Shimano	Satoshi Shimano	5:39
2.	"Hi no Ataru Basho (陽のあたる場所, A Place in the Sun)" (from Mother Father Brother Sister)	Misia, Jun Sasaki	Jun Sasaki	5:15
3.	"Kisu Shite Dakishimete (キスして抱きしめて, Kiss and Hold me)" (from Mother Father Brother Sister)	Misia	Misia	5:08
4.	"Into the Light" (from The Glory Day)	Misia	Hiroshi Matsui	6:20
5.	"The Glory Day" (from The Glory Day)	Misia, Mash	Shirō Sagisu	8:36
6.	"Believe" (from Love Is the Message)	Misia	Jun Sasaki	4:50
7.	"Wasurenai Hibi (忘れない日々, Unforgettable Days)" (from Love Is the Message)	Misia	Toshiaki Matsumoto	5:46
8.	"Sweetness" (from Love Is the Message)	Misia	Satoshi Shimano	5:53
9.	"It's Just Love" (from Love Is the Message)	Misia	Misia, Satoshi Shimano	6:25
10.	"Escape" (from Marvelous)	Misia	Misia, Sakoshin	4:56
11.	"Everything" (from Marvelous)	Misia	Toshiaki Matsumoto	7:47
12.	"Hatenaku Tsuzuku Sutōrī (Live version) (果てなく続くストーリー (Live version), Never Ending Story)" (from Kiss in the Sky)	Misia	Toshiaki Matsumoto	6:43
13.	"Amai Koibito (甘い恋人, Sweet Lover)" (Enhanced Music Video)	Misia	Tatsushi Kusunoki	3:04

== Charts ==
=== Oricon Sales Chart ===
Release	Chart	Peak Position	First Day/Week Sales	Sales Total	Chart Run
March 3, 2002	Oricon Daily Albums Chart	1			
March 3, 2002	Oricon Weekly Albums Chart	1	587,210	1,852,164	68 weeks
March 3, 2002	Oricon Monthly Albums Chart	1 (March); 7 (April)			
March 3, 2002	Oricon Yearly Albums Chart	4			

=== Physical Sales Charts ===
Chart	Peak position
Oricon Daily Albums Chart	1
Oricon Weekly Albums Chart	1
Oricon Monthly Albums Chart	1
Soundscan Albums Chart (CD-Only)	1
