= Hoshizora no Live: The Best of Acoustic Ballade =

Live album by Misia
- Released: October 22, 2003
- Recorded: August 2003
- Genre: R&B, J-pop
- Length: 76:46
- Label: Rhythmedia Tribe

Misia chronology
Misia Remix 2003 Kiss in the Sky: Non Stop Mix (2003)	Hoshizora no Live: The Best of Acoustic Ballade (2003)	Misia Single Collection: 5th Anniversary (2003)

Hoshizora no Live: The Best of Acoustic Ballade is Misia's first live album, released on October 22, 2003. It sold 72,351 copies in its first week and peaked at #2. The album features live recordings of Misia's outdoor acoustic concert held in Okinawa on August 15 and 16, 2003.

The album is certified Platinum for shipment of 250,000 copies.

== Track listing ==
No.	Title	Lyrics	Music	Length
1.	"Nemurenu Yoru wa Kimi no Sei (眠れぬ夜は君のせい, My Sleepless Nights Are Your Fault)" (from Kiss in the Sky)	Misia	Ken Matsubara	6:57
2.	"Escape" (from Marvelous)	Misia	Sakoshin	6:09
3.	"Ano Natsu no Mama de (あの夏のままで, Just Like That Summer)" (from Marvelous)	Misia	Hidetoshi Yamada	6:08
4.	"Mekubase no Burūsu (めくばせのブルース, Winking Blues)" (from Kiss in the Sky Kanzenban Limited Edition)	Tiger	Sakoshin	4:36
5.	"The Best of Time" (from Slow Jam: Sweet Ballade Collection)	Misia	Shirō Sagisu	5:39
6.	"It's Just Love" (from Love Is the Message)	Misia	Misia, Satoshi Shimano	6:45
7.	"Everything" (from Marvelous)	Misia	Toshiaki Matsumoto	6:46
8.	"Kisu Shite Dakishimete (キスして抱きしめて, Kiss and Hold me)" (from Mother Father Brother Sister)	Misia	Misia	6:30
9.	"Tsutsumikomu Yō ni... (つつみ込むように…, Like Being Wrapped Up...)" (from Mother Father Brother Sister)	Satoshi Shimano	Satoshi Shimano	6:31
10.	"Kokoro Hitotsu (心ひとつ, One Heart)" (from Mars & Roses)	Misia	Shirō Sagisu	5:04
11.	"Toki o Tomete (時をとめて, Stop Time)" (from Marvelous)	Misia	Misia	5:16
12.	"Tobikata wo Wasureta Chiisana Tori (飛び方を忘れた小さな鳥, The Small Bird Who's Forgotten How to Fly)" (from Kiss in the Sky)	Misia	Yudai Suzuki	4:29
13.	"Hoshi no Furu Oka (星の降る丘, Starry Hill)" (from Mother Father Brother Sister)	Chihiro Close	Satoshi Shimano	5:52

== Charts ==
=== Oricon Sales Chart ===
Release	Chart	Peak Position	First Day/Week Sales	Sales Total
October 22, 2003	Oricon Daily Albums Chart	2		
October 22, 2003	Oricon Weekly Albums Chart	2	72,351	209,538
October 22, 2003	Oricon Monthly Albums Chart	5		
October 22, 2003	Oricon Yearly Albums Chart	96		

=== Physical Sales Charts ===
Chart	Peak position
Oricon Daily Albums Chart	2
Oricon Weekly Albums Chart	2
Oricon Monthly Albums Chart	5
Soundscan Albums Chart (CD-Only)	2
