= Misia Single Collection: 5th Anniversary =

Compilation album by Misia
- Released: December 3, 2003
- Recorded: 1998–2003
- Genre: R&B, J-pop
- Length: 79:26
- Label: Arista Japan

Misia chronology
Hoshizora no Live: The Best of Acoustic Ballade (2003)	Misia Single Collection: 5th Anniversary (2003)	Mars & Roses (2004)

Misia Single Collection: 5th Anniversary is Misia's second compilation album, released on December 3, 2003. It sold 52,167 copies in its first week and peaked at #8. Misia Single Collection: 5th Anniversary was released by her previous label, Arista Japan, to commemorate her fifth anniversary.

The album is certified Platinum for shipment of 250,000 copies.

== Track listing ==
No.	Title	Lyrics	Music	Length
1.	"Tsutsumikomu Yō ni... (つつみ込むように…, Like Being Wrapped Up...)" (from Mother Father Brother Sister)	Satoshi Shimano	Satoshi Shimano	5:48
2.	"Never Gonna Cry! (Original Mix)" (from Mother Father Brother Sister)	Yoshiyuki Murakami, Suzi Kim, Tai	Hiroshi Matsui	6:09
3.	"Hi no Ataru Basho (陽のあたる場所, A Place in the Sun)" (from Mother Father Brother Sister)	Misia, Jun Sasaki	Jun Sasaki	5:15
4.	"Koisuru Kisetsu (恋する季節, Season of Love)" (from Mother Father Brother Sister)	Toshitaka Sonoda, Chihiro Close	Satoshi Shimano	5:41
5.	"Believe" (from Love Is the Message)	Misia	Jun Sasaki	4:48
6.	"Hana/Tori/Kaze/Tsuki (花／鳥／風／月, Flower/Bird/Wind/Moon)" (from Love Is the Message)	Chihiro Close	Hiroshi Matsui, Misia	5:50
7.	"Wasurenai Hibi (忘れない日々, Unforgettable Days)" (from Love Is the Message)	Misia	Toshiaki Matsumoto	5:50
8.	"One!" (from Love Is the Message)	Misia	Hiroshi Matsui	5:54
9.	"Sweetness" (from Love Is the Message)	Misia	Satoshi Shimano	5:53
10.	"Itoshii Hito (愛しい人, My Beloved)" (from Love Is the Message)	Misia	Misia	5:00
11.	"Escape" (from Marvelous)	Misia	Misia, Sakoshin	4:55
12.	"Change for Good" (from Marvelous)	Misia	Sakoshin	5:48
13.	"Everything" (from Marvelous)	Misia	Toshiaki Matsumoto	6:56
14.	"Ai no Uta (愛の歌, Love Song)" (from Marvelous)	Misia	Jun Sasaki	5:33

== Charts ==
=== Oricon sales chart ===
Release	Chart	Peak position	First day/week sales	Sales total
December 3, 2003	Oricon Daily Albums Chart	7		
December 3, 2003	Oricon Weekly Albums Chart	8	52,167	136,206
