= Misia Love & Ballads: The Best Ballade Collection =

Compilation album by Misia
- Released: June 16, 2004
- Genre: R&B, J-pop
- Length: 72:28
- Label: Arista Japan

Misia chronology
Mars & Roses (2004)	Misia Love & Ballads: The Best Ballade Collection (2004)	Singer for Singer (2004)

Misia Love & Ballads: The Best Ballade Collection is Misia's third compilation album, released on June 16, 2004 by her previous label Arista Japan. It sold 54,107 copies in its first week and peaked at #1.

The album is certified Gold for shipment of 100,000 copies.

== Track listing ==
No.	Title	Length
1.	"Everything" (from Marvelous)	7:00
2.	"Nemurenu Yoru wa Kimi no Sei (眠れぬ夜は君のせい, My Sleepless Nights Are Your Fault)" (from Kiss in the Sky)	5:25
3.	"Wasurenai Hibi (忘れない日々, Unforgettable Days)" (from Love Is the Message)	5:45
4.	"Kisu Shite Dakishimete (キスして抱きしめて, Kiss and Hold me)" (from Mother Father Brother Sister)	5:10
5.	"Ano Natsu no Mama de (あの夏のままで, Just Like That Summer)" (from Marvelous)	5:50
6.	"It's Just Love" (from Love Is the Message)	6:28
7.	"The Glory Day" (from The Glory Day)	8:35
8.	"Ano Hi no Yō ni (あの日のように, Like on That Day)" (from Love Is the Message)	5:47
9.	"Tobikata wo Wasureta Chiisana Tori (Star Ocean Version) (飛び方を忘れた小さな鳥 (STAR OCEAN version), The Small Bird Who's Forgotten How to Fly)" (from Kiss in the Sky Kanzenban Limited Edition)	5:09
10.	"Toki wo Tomete (時をとめて, Stop Time)" (from Marvelous)	4:48
11.	"Hoshi no Furu Oka (星の降る丘, Starry Hill)" (from Mother Father Brother Sister)	5:44
12.	"Hatenaku Tsuzuku Sutōrī (果てなく続くストーリー, Never Ending Story)" (from Kiss in the Sky)	6:28

== Charts ==
=== Oricon sales chart ===
Release	Chart	Peak position	First day/week sales	Sales total
June 16, 2004	Oricon Daily Albums Chart	1		
June 16, 2004	Oricon Weekly Albums Chart	1	54,107	175,187
June 16, 2004	Oricon Monthly Albums Chart	8		
June 16, 2004	Oricon Yearly Albums Chart	94		
