= The Super Tour of Misia: Girls Just Wanna Have Fun =

2018 concert tour by Misia

- Tour by Misia
- Start date: April 7, 2018
- End date: April 28, 2018
- Legs: 1
- No. of shows: 4 in Asia

Misia concert chronology
- Misia Summer Soul Jazz 2017 (2017); The Super Tour of Misia: Girls Just Wanna Have Fun (2018); Misia Hoshizora no Live X: Life Is Going On and On (2018)

The Super Tour of Misia: Girls Just Wanna Have Fun is a concert tour by Japanese singer Misia, held to celebrate her 20th anniversary as a recording artist. The tour, comprising four arena dates, began on April 7, 2018 at the Osaka-jō Hall in Osaka, and concluded three weeks later on April 28, 2018, at Yokohama Arena in Yokohama.

== Background ==
On September 26, 2017, Misia announced four arena shows scheduled for 2018, to commemorate her 20th anniversary as a musical act. A website with details concerning the concert tour was opened on October 10, 2017. On November 1, 2017, the premium "luxury" seats available to Club MSA members were announced as sold out. The first pressing of the DVD and Blu-ray of the Misia Summer Soul Jazz 2017 tour included a pre-sale access code which allowed fans to purchase tickets in advance of the public on-sale scheduled to start on February 10, 2018. On March 9, 2018, Misia announced a partnership with au to offer limited tickets and merchandise to au smartpass subscribers. On March 12, 2018, it was announced that tickets for the two Osaka-jō Hall shows as well as the April 28, 2018 Yokohama Arena concert had sold out.

On March 8, 2018, an embargo on tour details was lifted and the first round of tour members were announced; Yoshie of Be Bop Crew, who last toured with Misia nine years ago on The Tour of Misia Discotheque Asia, will join as choreographer and dancer. The entire cast of dancers and band members were announced on April 6, 2018.

On April 1, 2018, it was announced that The Super Tour of Misia finale will be broadcast on Wowow on July 7, 2018, in conjunction with a documentary chronicling Misia's most recent passage in Nairobi, Kenya, titled Nonfiction W, and a BBC Earth program, narrated by Misia, on white rhinoceros conservation, titled BBC Earth 2018 Dangerous Life: The Last White Rhino, as part of a three-show bundle.

== Set list ==
This set list is representative of the concert on April 28, 2018. It does not represent all concerts for the duration of the tour.

1. "Into the Light"
2. "Kimi no Soba ni Iru yo"
3. "Hi no Ataru Basho"
4. "Kuruzo Thrilling" (来るぞスリリング, "It's Coming, Thrilling")
5. "Mekubase no Blues" (めくばせのブルース, "The Winking Blues")
6. "Lady Funky"
7. "Orphans no Namida"
8. "Aitakute Ima"
9. "Snow Song"
10. "Tobikata o Wasureta Chiisana Tori" (飛び方を忘れた小さな鳥, "The Little Bird That Forgot How to Fly")
11. "Everything"
12. "Believe"
13. "Shiawase o Forever"
14. "The Glory Day"
15. "Super Rainbow"
16. "Hope & Dreams"
17. "Maware Maware"

Encore

17. "Anata ni Smile :)"
18. "Luv Parade"
19. "Tsutsumikomu Yō ni..."

Double Encore

20. "Kiss Shite Dakishimete" (キスして抱きしめて, "Kiss and Hold Me")

Notes:

- On the two shows in Osaka, "Shiawase o Forever" was omitted from the set list.
- On the April 7 and April 27 shows, "Kiss Shite Dakishimete" was omitted from the set list.

== Shows ==
List of concerts, showing date, city, country, and venue
| Date | City | Country | Venue |
|---|---|---|---|
| April 7, 2018 | Osaka | Japan | Osaka-jō Hall |
| April 8, 2018 | Osaka | Japan | Osaka-jō Hall |
| April 27, 2018 | Yokohama | Japan | Yokohama Arena |
| April 28, 2018 | Yokohama | Japan | Yokohama Arena |

== Personnel ==
Band

- Misia – lead vocals
- DJ Emma – DJ
- Tohru Shigemi - keyboards
- Takeshi Ohbayashi - keyboards
- Takuya Kuroda - trumpet
- Shuhei Yamaguchi - guitar
- Rashaan Carter - bass
- Tomo Kanno - drums
- Keita Ogawa - percussions
- Craig Hill - sax
- Akihiro Nishiguchi - sax
- Geila Zilkha - backing vocals
- Tiger - backing vocals
- Hanah Spring - backing vocals

Orchestra

- Gen Ittetsu – first violin
- Cameroun Maki – first violin
- Daisuke Kadowaki – first violin
- Yoko Fujinawa – first violin
- Takuya Mori – second violin
- Yuko Kajitani – second violin
- Kaoru Kuroki – second violin
- Yuki Nakajima – second violin
- Shoko Miki – viola
- Cristina Fujita – viola
- Toshiyuki Muranaka – cello
- Kirin Uchida – cello

Dancers

- Yoshie - dancer, choreographer
- Yuko Yano - dancer
- Mizuki - dancer
- Mika Nishimura - dancer
- Calin - dancer
- Haruna Yamanaka - dancer
- Tomohiko Tsujimoto - choreographer
- Show-Ya - dancer
- Hina - dancer
- Sae Kodama - dancer
- Naomi Shimotsukasa - dancer
- Kurumi - dancer
- Haruka - dancer
- Maya - dancer
- Mao Jintoku - dancer
- Kasumi Sakurai - dancer
- Rion - dancer
- Kou Yamamoto - dancer
- Maika Fujii - dancer
- Saaya Takaoka - dancer
- Kenken - dancer
