= Misia Candle Night 2014 =

2014 concert tour by Misia

- Tour by Misia
- Start date: August 23, 2014
- End date: November 29, 2014
- Legs: 2
- No. of shows: 6 in Asia

Misia concert chronology
- Misia Hoshizora no Live VII: 15th Celebration (2013–14); Misia Candle Night 2014 (2014); Misia Hoshizora no Live VIII: Moon Journey (2015)

Misia Candle Night 2014 was a concert tour by Japanese singer Misia and the third installment of the Misia Candle Night concert series. The tour began on August 23, 2014, at the Sapporo Art Park in Sapporo, Hokkaido and concluded on September 13, 2014, at the Sanuki Theatron in Sanuki, Kagawa. An additional date was held on November 29, 2014, at the Nakagusuku Castle in Kitanakagusuku, Okinawa, as part of the World Heritage Theater project.

== Background ==
On April 18, 2014, Misia announced she would be embarking on a five-date outdoor installment of the Misia Candle Night concert series scheduled to begin on August 9, 2014. On May 31, 2014, a page on the tour website was set up for fans to submit song requests for the tour. On July 20, 2014, ticket sales were opened to the general public. On August 6, 2014, it was announced that the first date of the tour would be cancelled because of the Halong typhoon. The concert was postponed to September 13, 2014. On October 1, 2014, a last date was announced, in participation with the World Heritage Project in Japan, to be held at a special outdoor stage neighboring the Nakagusuku Castle ruins on November 29, 2014. The concert was broadcast on Wowow's Prime channel on January 31, 2015, and later released as the video album Misia Candle Night at Okinawa on April 1, 2015.

== Set list ==
This set list is representative of the concert on September 13, 2014. It does not represent all concerts for the duration of the tour.

1. "Re-Brain"
2. "Believe"
3. "Aoi Tsukikage" (蒼い月影, "Blue Moonlight")
4. "Mahō o Kaketa no wa Kimi" (魔法をかけたのは君, "You Put a Spell on Me")
5. "Miss You Always"
6. "Ai o Shiru Sekai" (アイヲシルセカイ, "A World That Knows Love")
7. "Nemurenu Yoru wa Kimi no Sei"
8. "Life in Harmony"
9. "Toki ni wa Mukashi no Hanashi o" (時には昔の話を, "Once in a While, Talk of the Old Days") (Tokiko Kato cover)
10. "The Rose"
11. "Song for You"
12. "Sukoshi Zutsu Taisetsu ni"
13. "Shiawase o Forever"
14. "My Pride of Love"
15. "Boku wa Pegasus Kimi wa Polaris"
16. "Tsutsumikomu Yō ni..." (Acoustic version)
17. "One Day, One Life"
18. "Candle of Life"
Notes
- During the August 23, September 6-7 dates, Misia sang a string version of "Angels We Have Heard on High", arranged by Shirō Sagisu, with her backup singers to start the shows.
- "Believe" was added to the set list of the last three shows.
- "Koisuru Kimochi" was performed during the first two shows of the tour.
- "Mahō o Kaketa no wa Kimi" was only performed during the August 23 and September 13 shows.
- "Nemurenu Yoru wa Kimi no sei" was sung at every show except for the first date.
- "Life in Harmony" was omitted from the set list of the August 30 and September 7 shows.
- "The Rose" was sung at every show other than the September 6 and November 29 shows.
- "Song for You" and "My Pride of Love" were omitted from the set list of the November 29 show.
- "To Be in Love" was performed on the first three dates of the tour.
- "Taiyō no Malaika" was added to the set list of the September 7 show.
- "Candle of Life", formerly known as "Another Life", was performed for the first time at the September 6 show and at every following date.
- "Tsutsumikomu Yō ni..." was only sung at the August 30 and September 13 shows.
- "Tobikata o Wasureta Chiisana Tori", "Everything" and "Hatenaku Tsuzuku Story" were added to the set list of the November 29 show.

== Shows ==
List of concerts, showing date, city, country, venue, and opening acts.
Date	City	Country	Venue
Leg 1—Asia
August 23, 2014	Sapporo	Japan	Sapporo Art Park
August 30, 2014	Nagasaki	Japan	Mount Inasa Park
September 6, 2014	Fujikawaguchiko	Japan	Kawaguchiko Stellar Theater
September 7, 2014	Fujikawaguchiko	Japan	Kawaguchiko Stellar Theater
September 13, 2014	Sanuki	Japan	Sanuki Theatron
Leg 2—Asia
November 29, 2014	Kitanakagusuku	Japan	Nakagusuku Castle

== Cancelled shows ==
Date	City	Country	Venue	Reason
August 9, 2014	Sanuki	Japan	Sanuki Theatron	Typhoon Halong (2014)

== Personnel ==
Band

- Misia – lead vocals
- Tohru Shigemi – keyboard
- Shūhei Yamaguchi – guitar
- Sokusai – bass
- Fuyu – drums
- Kaori Sawada - keyboard, backing vocals
- Hanah Spring - backing vocals
- Lyn - backing vocals
- Gen Ittetsu - strings
- Maki Cameroun - strings
- Mori Takuya - strings
- Yayoi Fujita - strings
- Shōko Miki - strings
- Chikako Nishimura - strings
- Toshiyuki Muranaka - strings
- Masami Horisawa - strings
