= Misia Summer Soul Jazz 2017 =

2017 concert tour by Misia

- Tour by Misia
- Associated album: Misia Soul Jazz Session
- Start date: July 1, 2017
- End date: July 16, 2017
- Legs: 1
- No. of shows: 7 in Asia

Misia concert chronology
- Misia Candle Night 2017 (2017); Misia Summer Soul Jazz 2017 (2017); The Super Tour of Misia: Girls Just Wanna Have Fun (2018)

Misia Summer Soul Jazz 2017 was a concert tour by Japanese singer Misia to promote her second extended play, Misia Soul Jazz Session. The tour was held exclusively in Zepp concert halls, beginning on July 1, 2017 in Nagoya, and ending two weeks later on July 16, 2017 in Osaka. The July 7, 2017 concert was released on DVD and Blu-ray on November 29, 2017.

== Background ==
On February 21, 2017, the 19th anniversary of her debut, Misia announced on her radio show Misia Hoshizora no Radio that, starting in the summer of 2017, she would embark on the first installment of the Misia Summer Soul Jazz concert series. Six concert dates were posted on her official website the following day. The announcement was followed on March 1, 2017 with the opening of an official website for the tour. On April 4, 2017, Misia announced a seventh date to the tour, a birthday concert exclusive to members of her fan-club, Club MSA. Ticket sales for the concert tour opened to Club MSA members on April 20, 2017, and to the general public on April 29, 2017.

On May 29, 2017, Misia announced that Takuya Kuroda and his collaborating musicians, also the recording members for Misia Soul Jazz Session, would be joining her on tour as her band. The same day, she publicized Wowow's intentions to broadcast the birthday concert on their On Demand service on August 13, 2017.

== Set list ==
This set list is representative of the concert on July 1, 2017. It does not represent all concerts for the duration of the tour.

1. "Believe"
2. "Mayonaka no Hide-and-seek" (真夜中のHIDE-AND-SEEK, "Midnight Hide-and-seek")
3. "Kuruzo Thrilling" (来るぞスリリング, "It's Coming, Thrilling")
4. "Unmei Loop" (運命loop, "Destiny Loop")
5. "The Best of Time"
6. "Mekubase no Blues" (めくばせのブルース, "The Winking Blues")
7. "Orphans no Namida"
8. "It's Just Love"
9. "Tsutsumikomu Yō ni..."
10. "Don't You Worry 'bout a Thing" (Japanese Version)
11. "Maware Maware" (Japanese Version)
12. "Hi no Ataru Basho"

Encore

13. "Saigo no Yogisha" (最後の夜汽車, "Last Night Train")

Double Encore

14. "Kiss Shite Dakishimete" (キスして抱きしめて, "Kiss and Hold Me")

Notes:

- On the second show in Nagoya, as well as on the first show in Tokyo, "Kiss Shite Dakishimete" was omitted from the set list. The song was performed as a double encore at every other show, barring the birthday concert, for which it was moved to the middle of the set list.

== Shows ==
List of concerts, showing date, city, country, and venue
| Date | City | Country | Venue |
|---|---|---|---|
| July 1, 2017 | Nagoya | Japan | Zepp Nagoya |
| July 2, 2017 | Nagoya | Japan | Zepp Nagoya |
| July 7, 2017 (Note: The concert on July 7, 2017 at Zepp DiverCity in Tokyo was a fan-club exclusive concert held in celebration of Misia's thirty-ninth birthday.) | Tokyo | Japan | Zepp DiverCity |
| July 8, 2017 | Tokyo | Japan | Zepp DiverCity |
| July 9, 2017 | Tokyo | Japan | Zepp DiverCity |
| July 15, 2017 | Osaka | Japan | Zepp Namba |
| July 16, 2017 | Osaka | Japan | Zepp Namba |

== Personnel ==
Band

- Misia – lead vocals
- Takuya Kuroda – trumpet
- Craig Hill – tenor sax
- Corey King – trombone
- Takeshi Ohbayashi – keyboard
- Rashaan Carter – bass
- Adam Jackson – drums
