= Misia Soul Jazz Session =

EP by Misia
- Released: July 26, 2017
- Recorded: Bunker Studio; Rhythmedia Studio
- Genre: Soul jazz
- Length: 46:43
- Label: Ariola Japan
- Producer: Misia; Takuya Kuroda; Hiroto Tanigawa (exec.)

Misia chronology
Misia Hoshizora no Live Song Book: History of Hoshizora Live (2016)	Misia Soul Jazz Session (2017)	Life Is Going On and On (2018)

Misia Soul Jazz Session (stylized as MISIA SOUL JAZZ SESSION) is the second extended play by Japanese singer Misia. It was released on July 26, 2017, through Ariola Japan. The album was entirely produced and arranged by Takuya Kuroda. It features reworked versions of her previous material with a soul-jazz arrangement, as well as two new songs and a cover of Kai Band's "Saigo no Yogisha", from the album Kono Yoru ni Sayonara (1977).

== Background and release ==
The idea of creating a record and holding a joint tour with Kuroda emerged after Misia collaborated with him for the Blue Note Jazz Festival in Japan 2016 tour, where they performed a whole set together with his band. The album mainly focuses on reworking select songs from Misia's catalogue, including the singles "Hi no Ataru Basho", "Believe" and "Orphans no Namida". Misia recorded two new tracks for the album, both written by Kiyoshi and composed by Kenji Hayashida. "Kuruzo Thrilling", a percussion-heavy brazilian jazz-inspired track, features Raúl Midón on the guitar, and on "Unmei Loop", Misia welcomes Marcus Miller, whom she first collaborated with impromptu during the Blue Note Jazz Festival in Japan 2016 concert on the song "Orphans no Namida". The album closes with "Saigo no Yogisha", a cover of the 1977 song by Kai Band. The song was recorded at the demand of Sanma Akashiya, to be used as the theme song to the Netflix original series Jimmy: Aho Mitai na Honma no Hanashi, which he produced. The nine-track EP was issued in Blu-spec CD2 and the limited edition of the album was packaged in digipak format.

== Promotion ==
Starting on July 1, 2017, Misia, Kuroda and his band embarked on the seven-date concert tour Misia Summer Soul Jazz 2017 to promote the album, which culminated with the release of Misia Soul Jazz Session. The new tracks included on the record both received commercial tie-ins: "Unmei Loop" serves as theme song to the Nintendo Switch, PlayStation 4 and Microsoft Windows game Nobunaga's Ambition: Taishi (2017), while "Kuruzo Thrilling" was used by Wowow as its theme song to their 2018 LPGA Tour broadcasts.

== Commercial performance ==
Misia Soul Jazz Session entered the daily Oricon Albums Chart at number 8. It peaked the following day at number 7. The album debuted at number 11 on the weekly Oricon Albums Chart, with sales of 8,000 copies. Misia Soul Jazz Session also debuted on the Billboard Japan Hot Albums chart, at number 14, and on the Top Albums Sales chart, at number 10. The EP charted for nine weeks on the Oricon Albums Chart, selling a reported total of 14,000 copies during its run.

== Track listing ==
No.	Title	Lyrics	Music	Length
1.	"Believe"	Misia	Jun Sasaki	4:48
2.	"Kuruzo Thrilling" (featuring Raúl Midón) (来るぞスリリング, Kuru zo Suriringu, "It's Coming, Thrilling")	Kiyoshi	Kenji Hayashida	4:49
3.	"Mayonaka no Hide-and-seek" (真夜中のHIDE-AND-SEEK, "Midnight Hide-and-seek")	Misia	Shirō Sagisu	4:32
4.	"Unmei Loop" (featuring Marcus Miller) (運命loop, "Destiny Loop")	Kiyoshi	Hayashida	5:03
5.	"Orphans no Namida"	Misia	Sagisu	5:57
6.	"It's Just Love"	Misia	Misia; Satoshi Shimano	5:50
7.	"The Best of Time"	Misia	Sagisu	5:44
8.	"Hi no Ataru Basho"	Misia; Sasaki	Sasaki	5:06
9.	"Saigo no Yogisha" (最後の夜汽車, "Last Night Train")	Yoshihiro Kai	Kai	4:54
Total length:				46:43

== Credits and personnel ==
Personnel

- All vocals – Misia
- Songwriting – Misia, Jun Sasaki, Kiyoshi, Kenji Hayashida, Shirō Sagisu, Satoshi Shimano, Yoshihiro Kai
- Arrangement, production, trumpet – Takuya Kuroda
- Electric keyboard – Takahiro Izumikawa, Takeshi Ohbayashi
- Guitar – Raúl Midón
- Drums – Adam Jackson
- Trombone – Corey King
- Bass – Rashaan Carter, Marcus Miller, Parker McAllister
- Percussions – Keita Ogawa, Adam Jackson
- Tenor sax – Craig Hill, Lucas Pino
- Engineering – Todd Carder, Masahiro Kawaguchi
- Mixing – Masahiro Kawaguchi
- Mastering – Herb Powers Jr.

== Charts ==
Chart (2017)	Peak position
Japan Daily Albums (Oricon)	7
Japan Weekly Albums (Oricon)	11
Japan Monthly Albums (Oricon)	47
Japan Hot Albums (Billboard)	14
Japan Top Albums Sales (Billboard)	10

== Sales ==
Region	Certification	Certified units/sales
Japan	—	14,000
