= Misia Candle Night 2017 =

2017 concert tour by Misia

- Tour by Misia
- Promotional poster for the first leg of the tour
- Start date: May 27, 2017
- End date: August 27, 2017
- Legs: 2
- No. of shows: 4 in Asia

Misia concert chronology
- The Tour of Misia Love Bebop: All Roads Lead to You (2016–17); Misia Candle Night 2017 (2017); Misia Summer Soul Jazz 2017 (2017)

Misia Candle Night 2017 was a concert tour by Japanese singer Misia and the sixth installment of the Misia Candle Night concert series. The tour spanned four shows across two locations. The first two shows were held in May 2017, at the Sengan-en in Kagoshima to commemorate its World Heritage Site declaration. The second leg of the tour began and ended with two shows at Kawaguchiko Stellar Theater in Fujikawaguchiko, Yamanashi in August 2017.

== First leg ==
On January 16, 2017, the first leg of the tour, dubbed Dai-sanjūsan-kai JTB Sekai Isan Gekijō: Kagoshima Sengan-en Sekai Isan Tōroku Kinen Misia Candle Night (第33回JTB世界遺産劇場‐鹿児島 仙巌園‐ 世界遺産登録記念 Misia Candle Night) and consisting of two shows scheduled for March 25-26, 2017 at the Japanese garden Sengan-en, to celebrate it receiving the distinction of World Heritage Site, was announced. On March 2, 2017, Misia issued a statement through her official website and social media saying that she had been hospitalized with acute viral hepatitis and would have to postpone her upcoming guest appearance at the benefit concert The Unforgettable Day 3.11, as well as the two Misia Candle Night dates. A week later, Misia posted on her instagram that she had been discharged from the hospital and was recuperating at home. The Misia Candle Night shows were re-scheduled for May 27-28, 2017.

On March 31, 2017, a poll was set up through Misia's official mobile app World of Misia where fans could vote for which songs they would like Misia to cover in concert. The top ten vote-getters, including Stevie Wonder's "Don't You Worry 'Bout a Thing", which Misia covered earlier in 2017 for the Japanese dub of the movie Sing, Miyuki Nakajima's "Ito" (糸) and Koji Tamaki's "Melody" (メロディー) at the top of the list, were revealed on May 26, 2017.

The charity Candle Night Bar also took place this year and 420,835 yen were raised to be redistributed through the non-profit organization Mudef towards sponsoring the Magoso school in Nairobi's Kibera Slum's entrance into the local music festival.

=== Set list ===
This set list is representative of the concert on May 27, 2017. It does not represent all concerts for the duration of the tour.

1. "Tsutsumikomu Yō ni..."
2. "Melody"
3. "Mayonaka no Hide-and-seek" (真夜中のHIDE-AND-SEEK, "Midnight Hide-and-seek")
4. "Hallelujah" (Leonard Cohen cover)
5. "Super Rainbow"
6. "Don't You Worry 'bout a Thing" (Japanese version)
7. "Melody" (メロディー) (Koji Tamaki cover)
8. "Wasurenai Hibi"
9. "Orphans no Namida"
10. "Aitakute Ima"
11. "Everything"
12. "Shiawase o Forever"
13. "Anata ni Smile :)"
14. "Ashita e"
15. "Candle of Life"

Notes:

- On the May 28, 2017 show, Misia performed fourteen songs, omitting "Tsutsumikomu Yō ni..." from the set list. She also swapped "Wasurenai Hibi" for "Hana", and instead of performing a cover of Koji Tamaki's "Melody" again, she chose to perform the second-place vote-getter song "Ito" by Miyuki Nakajima.

== Second leg ==
The second leg of the Misia Candle Night 2017 tour was announced just short of a month after the first leg had wrapped, on June 20, 2017. It consisted of two shows at Kawaguchiko Stellar Theater scheduled for late August 2017 and was promoted as Misia's last concerts of the year and until her 20th anniversary. The charity Candle Night Bar raised an additional 534,300 yen, bringing total proceeds to 955,135 yen.

=== Set list ===
This set list is representative of the concert on August 26, 2017. It does not represent all concerts for the duration of the tour.

1. "Unmei Loop" (運命loop, "Destiny Loop")
2. "Kuruzo Thrilling" (来るぞスリリング, "It's Coming, Thrilling")
3. "Heal the World"
4. "Ano Natsu no Mama de" (あの夏のままで, "Like That Summer")
5. "Aoi Tsukikage" (蒼い月影, "Blue Moonlight")
6. "Hallelujah" (Leonard Cohen cover)
7. "Don't You Worry 'bout a Thing" (Japanese version)
8. "Hontō no Koto" (ほんとうのこと, "The Truth") (Sayuri Ishikawa cover)
9. "Hana" (花, "Flower")
10. "Orphans no Namida"
11. "Anata ni Smile :)"
12. "Shiawase o Forever"
13. "Everything"
14. "One Day, One Life"
15. "Candle of Life"
16. "Ashita e"

Notes:

- On the August 27, 2017 show, Misia performed "Mayonaka no Hide-and-seek" in place of "Hana". She also performed "Ano Natsu no Mama de" later in the set than on the previous show.
- During both shows, Misia was joined by Geila Zilkha to perform a duet of "Aoi Tsukikage".

== Shows ==
List of concerts, showing date, city, country, and venue
Date	City	Country	Venue
Leg 1
May 27, 2017	Kagoshima	Japan	Sengan-en
May 28, 2017	Kagoshima	Japan	Sengan-en
Leg 2
August 26, 2017	Fujikawaguchiko	Japan	Kawaguchiko Stellar Theater
August 27, 2017	Fujikawaguchiko	Japan	Kawaguchiko Stellar Theater

== Cancelled shows ==
Date	City	Country	Venue	Reason
March 25, 2017	Kagoshima	Japan	Sengan-en	Health problems
March 26, 2017	Kagoshima	Japan	Sengan-en	Health problems

== Personnel ==
Band (First Leg)

- Misia – lead vocals
- Tohru Shigemi – keyboard
- Shūhei Yamaguchi – guitar
- Jino – bass
- Tomo Kanno – drums
- Akio Suzuki - sax, flute
- Kumi Sasaki – backing vocals, organ
- Tiger - backing vocals
- Hanah Spring - backing vocals

Band (Second Leg)

- Misia – lead vocals
- Tohru Shigemi – keyboard
- Shūhei Yamaguchi – guitar
- Takeshi Taneda – bass
- Tomo Kanno – drums
- Asa-Chang – percussions
- Kumi Sasaki – backing vocals, organ
- Geila Zilkha - backing vocals
