= Misia Remix 1999 =

Remix album by Misia
- Released: June 9, 1999
- Genre: R&B, dance, house
- Label: BMG Japan

Misia chronology
The Glory Day (1998)	Misia Remix 1999 (1999)	Love Is the Message (2000)

Alternative covers
- Vinyl cover

Misia Remix 1999 is the first remix album by Japanese R&B singer Misia, released June 9, 1999. It was released in cassette and vinyl formats only. Misia Remix 1999 debuted at #36 on the weekly Oricon chart, selling 8,770 copies in its first week.

== Cassette track listing ==
Side A
No.	Title	Remixer(s)	Length
1.	"Hi no Ataru Basho" (Shomari Remix)	Shomari	5:30
2.	"Melody" (Masters at Work Remix)	Masters at Work	8:32
3.	"Koisuru Kisetsu, Martin Lascelles Remix" (恋する季節 "Season of Love")	Martin Lascelles	5:56

Side B
No.	Title	Remixer(s)	Length
1.	"Tsutsumikomu Yō ni..." (Dodge Remix)	DJ Dodge	5:58
2.	"Cry" (Gomi Remix)	Gomi	11:09

== Vinyl track listing ==
Side A
No.	Title	Remixer(s)	Length
1.	"Hi no Ataru Basho" (Shomari Remix)	Shomari	5:30
2.	"Melody" (Masters at Work Remix)	Masters at Work	8:32

Side B
No.	Title	Remixer(s)	Length
1.	"Tsutsumikomu Yō ni..." (Dodge Remix)	DJ Dodge	5:58
2.	"Cry" (Gomi Remix)	Gomi	11:09

== Charts and sales ==
Chart (1999)	Peak position	Sales
Japan Oricon Weekly Albums Chart	36	13,660
