= Fullmetal Alchemist (disambiguation) =

Fullmetal Alchemist is a manga series created by Hiromu Arakawa.

Fullmetal Alchemist may also refer to:

- Fullmetal Alchemist (TV series), the first televised adaptation of the manga
- Fullmetal Alchemist: Brotherhood, the second televised adaptation of the manga
- Fullmetal Alchemist (film), a live-action film adapted from the manga
- Edward Elric, a character appearing in the manga and its subsequent adaptations who is referred to as the Fullmetal Alchemist
