= Ai no Katachi =

Song recorded by Japanese singer Misia

Single by Misia featuring Hide (Greeeen)

from the album Life Is Going On and On
- Released: August 22, 2018
- Recorded: July 1, 2018
- Genre: Pop
- Length: 4:26
- Label: Ariola Japan
- Songwriter: Greeeen
- Producer: Seiji Kameda

Misia singles chronology
"Kimi no Soba ni Iru yo" (2017)	"Ai no Katachi" (2018)

Music video
- "Ai no Katachi" on YouTube

"Ai no Katachi" (アイノカタチ; lit. "Shape of Love") is a song recorded by Japanese singer Misia, featuring Hide from Greeeen on the chorus backing vocals. It was released digitally by Ariola Japan on July 31, 2018, while the physical single was released on August 22, 2018. The song was written and composed by Greeeen and produced and arranged by Seiji Kameda. It is the theme song of the TBS drama series Gibo to Musume no Blues.

== Chart performance ==
"Ai no Katachi" debuted at number 3 on Oricon's Digital Singles chart with 18,000 downloads sold, marking Misia's first entry onto the chart. The song peaked at number one the following week, with sales of 29,000, downloads, making it Misia's first song to reach the top of the Digital Singles chart."Ai no Katachi" stayed at number one for two consecutive weeks. The song also made its debut on the Billboard Japan Hot 100 at number 23 and at number 5 on Billboard Japan's Download Songs chart. It rose to number ten on the Hot 100, becoming Misia's eighth top-ten entry on the chart, and number two on the Download Songs chart the following week. "Ai no Katachi" debuted at number 3 and number 2, respectively, on the RecoChoku and Mora Weekly Singles charts. It then reached number one on both charts in its second week.

== Track listing ==
No.	Title	Writer(s)	Producer(s)	Length
1.	"Ai no Katachi" (アイノカタチ, "Shape of Love")	Greeeen	Seiji Kameda	4:26
2.	"Lady Funky"	Kiyoshi; Misia; Hiromasa Ijichi	Takuya Kuroda	4:44
3.	"Ai no Katachi" (TV Size)	Greeeen	Kameda	2:23
4.	"Ai no Katachi" (Instrumental)	Greeeen	Kameda	4:25
5.	"Lady Funky" (12" Funky Remix)	Kiyoshi; Misia; Ijichi	$akoshin	4:36
Total length:				20:34

First pressing secret track
No.	Title	Remixer(s)	Length
6.	"Ai no Katachi" (Muroleo Lover's Remix)	DJ Muro; Leo Nanjo	4:19
Total length:			24:53

== Charts ==
Chart (2018)	Peak position
Japan Daily Singles (Oricon)	7
Japan Weekly Singles (Oricon)	15
Japan Weekly Combined Singles (Oricon)	3
Japan Weekly Digital Singles (Oricon)	1
Japan Weekly Streaming (Oricon)	5
Japan Hot 100 (Billboard)	4
Japan Download Songs (Billboard)	1
Japan Streaming Songs (Billboard)	2
Japan Top Singles Sales (Billboard)	15
Japan Weekly Singles (RecoChoku)	1
Japan Weekly Singles (Mora)	1

== Certifications ==
Region	Certification	Certified units/sales
Japan	—	67,000
Japan (RIAJ) Digital	3× Platinum	750,000^{*}
Streaming
Japan (RIAJ)	2× Platinum	200,000,000^{†}
^{*} Sales figures based on certification alone.^{†} Streaming-only figures based on certification alone.
