= Back in Love Again =

Back in Love Again may refer to:

- "Back in Love Again", a song by Donna Summer, 1978
- "Back in Love Again" (Misia song), 2012
- "(Every Time I Turn Around) Back in Love Again", a song by L.T.D.
