= Life Is Going On and On =

Studio album by Misia
- Released: December 26, 2018
- Genres: Pop; R&B; soul jazz; new jack swing
- Length: 49:24
- Label: Ariola Japan
- Producers: Ichi; Seiji Kameda; Takuya Kuroda; Hiroshi Matsui; Shirō Sagisu; Sakoshin; Hiroto Tanigawa (exec.)

Misia chronology
| Misia Soul Jazz Session (2017) | Life Is Going On and On (2018) | Misia Soul Jazz Best 2020 (2020) |

Singles from Life Is Going On and On
- 1. "Super Rainbow" Released: July 22, 2016; 2. "Kimi no Soba ni Iru yo" Released: November 29, 2017; 3. "Ai no Katachi" Released: August 22, 2018

Life Is Going On and On is the thirteenth studio album by Japanese singer Misia. It was released on December 26, 2018, through Ariola Japan.

== Commercial performance ==
Life Is Going On and On entered the Oricon Albums Chart at number 5. It peaked on the daily chart at number 3 on January 13, 2019. The album debuted at number 6 on the weekly Oricon Albums Chart, with sales of 16,000 copies, and reached its peak rank of number 5 the following week, selling 11,000 copies. The album also charted on the newly minted Oricon Combined Albums Chart, where it also peaked at number 5 on its second charting week. The album has currently spent four weeks within the top twenty and sold a combined (physical albums and downloads) total of 44,000 copies.

== Track listing ==
| No. | Title | Writer(s) | Producer(s) | Length |
|---|---|---|---|---|
| 1. | "Ai no Katachi" (featuring Hide Greeeen) | Hide | Seiji Kameda | 4:22 |
| 2. | "Kimi no Soba ni Iru yo" | Misia; Ichiro Suezawa; Mayu Wakisaka | Ichi | 3:59 |
| 3. | "Interlude" | Sakoshin | Sakoshin | 0:25 |
| 4. | "Sparks!!" | Misia; Kiyoshi; Sakoshin | Sakoshin | 3:25 |
| 5. | "Kuruzo Thrilling" (Album Version) (来るぞスリリング Kuruzo Suriringu, "It's Coming, Thrilling") | Kiyoshi; Kenji Hayashida | Takuya Kuroda | 5:16 |
| 6. | "Lady Funky" | Misia; Kiyoshi; Hiromasa Ijichi | Kuroda | 4:40 |
| 7. | "Koibito Shikaku" (featuring Toshinori Yonekura) (恋人失格, "No Longer Lovers") | Toshinori Yonekura | Kuroda | 3:31 |
| 8. | "Kawariyuku Kono Machi de" (変わりゆく この街で, "In This Ever-changing Town") | Misia; Hideya Kojima | Kuroda | 3:40 |
| 9. | "Loved" | Yonekura | Kuroda | 4:56 |
| 10. | "Serendipity" | Misia; Toshiaki Matsumoto | Kuroda | 3:56 |
| 11. | "Amazing Life" | Misia; Hidekazu Uchiike | Shirō Sagisu | 5:54 |
| 12. | "Super Rainbow" | Misia; Her0ism; Shusui | Hiroshi Matsui | 5:16 |
| Total length: | | | | 49:24 |

== Charts ==
| Chart (2018–19) | Peak position |
|---|---|
| Japan Daily Albums (Oricon) | 3 |
| Japan Weekly Albums (Oricon) | 5 |
| Japan Weekly Combined Albums (Oricon) | 5 |
| Japan Weekly Digital Albums (Oricon) | 6 |
| Japan Monthly Albums (Oricon) | 8 |
| Japan Hot Albums (Billboard) | 6 |
| Japan Top Albums Sales (Billboard) | 6 |
| Japan Top Download Albums (Billboard) | 10 |
| Japan Weekly Albums (RecoChoku) | 2 |
