= I Miss You (Toki o Koete) =

2001 single by Misia

Single by Misia

from the album Marvelous
- Released: January 1, 2001
- Recorded: 2000
- Genre: R&B, J-pop
- Length: 8:04
- Label: Arista Japan
- Songwriter(s): Misia, Masato Nakamura

Misia singles chronology
"Everything" (2000)	"I Miss You (Toki o Koete)" (2001)	"Hatenaku Tsuzuku Story" (2002)

"I Miss You (Toki o Koete)" (Japanese: I Miss You 〜時を越えて〜, lit. 'I Miss You (Crossing Time)') is Misia's 8th and last single with Arista Japan. It was released on January 1, 2001, under the name of "Misia+DCT". It peaked at #3 on the Oricon Singles Chart, selling 224,740 copies on its first week. The song is a duet between Misia and Dreams Come True vocalist, Miwa Yoshida. Misia penned the lyrics and composed the melody alongside DCT band member, Masato Nakamura.

== Track list ==
All lyrics are written by Misia

No.	Title	Length
1.	"I Miss You (Toki o Koete)" (I Miss You 〜時を越えて〜, I Miss You (Crossing Time))	3:35
2.	"I Miss You (Toki o Koete)" (Gomi's Remix / Radio Edit) (I Miss You 〜時を越えて〜 (Gomi's Remix / Radio Edit))	4:24

== Charts ==
Release	Chart	Peak position	Sales total	Chart run
January 1, 2001	Oricon Daily Singles Chart	2		
January 1, 2001	Oricon Weekly Singles Chart	3	432,050	9 weeks
January 1, 2001	Oricon Monthly Singles Chart	4		
January 1, 2001	Oricon Yearly Singles Chart	38		
