= Misia Hoshizora no Live X: Life Is Going On and On =

2018–19 concert tour by Misia

- Tour by Misia
- Start date: June 17, 2018
- End date: April 28, 2019
- Legs: 4
- No. of shows: 53 in Asia

Misia concert chronology
- The Super Tour of Misia: Girls Just Wanna Have Fun (2018); Misia Hoshizora no Live X: Life Is Going On and On (2018)

Misia Hoshizora no Live X: Life Is Going On and On (MISIA 星空のライヴX Life is going on and on) is a concert tour by Japanese singer Misia, and the tenth installment of the Hoshizora Live concert series. The tour began on June 17, 2018, at the Taipei International Convention Center in Taipei. The hall dates concluded on March 22, 2019, at the Fukuoka Sun Palace. Three arena dates were held at the Nippon Budokan on April 26 through April 28 to commemorate the transition from the Heisei era to the Reiwa era.

== Background ==
On January 3, 2018, Misia announced that as part of her ongoing 20th anniversary celebration, she would embark on a hall tour under the Hoshizora Live series. On January 10, 2018, she announced the first round of Japanese dates for the tour. On January 15, 2017, Misia added an additional date to the first leg of the tour in Japan, at the Hiroshima Bunka Gakuen HBG Hall in Hiroshima. On March 29, 2018, Misia announced the tour would begin with a concert in Taipei on June 17, 2018, at the Taipei International Convention Center, marking her first concert in Taiwan in five years. On April 23, 2018, five additional dates were added to the second leg of the tour, totaling sixteen shows over a three-month period. On May 2, 2018, the third leg of the tour, consisting of 21 shows, was announced to begin on October 10, 2018, at the Festival Hall in Osaka and conclude on February 20, 2019, at NHK Hall in Tokyo.

== Shows ==
List of concerts, showing date, city, country, and venue
Date	City	Country	Venue
Leg 1—Taiwan
June 17, 2018	Taipei	Taiwan	Taipei International Convention Center
Leg 2—Hall dates
June 30, 2018	Kanazawa	Japan	Honda no Mori Hall
July 7, 2018	Tokyo	Japan	Tokyo International Forum
July 13, 2018	Takamatsu	Japan	Sunport Hall Takamatsu
July 14, 2018	Matsuyama	Japan	Matsuyama Civic Center
August 1, 2018	Nagasaki	Japan	Nagasaki Brick Hall
August 3, 2018	Ōita	Japan	iichiko Grand Theater
August 6, 2018	Saga	Japan	Sagashi Bunka Kaikan
August 25, 2018	Fujikawaguchiko	Japan	Kawaguchiko Stellar Theater
September 1, 2018	Ginowan	Japan	Okinawa Convention Center
September 2, 2018	Ginowan	Japan	Okinawa Convention Center
September 7, 2018	Tokyo	Japan	NHK Hall
September 8, 2018	Tokyo	Japan	NHK Hall
September 22, 2018	Hiroshima	Japan	Hiroshima Bunka Gakuen HBG Hall
September 24, 2018	Kurashiki	Japan	Kurashiki City Auditorium
September 29, 2018	Tokyo	Japan	Olympus Hall Hachioji
Leg 3—Hall dates		Japan	
October 10, 2018	Osaka	Japan	Festival Hall
October 11, 2018	Osaka	Japan	Festival Hall
October 14, 2018	Tokyo	Japan	Tokyo International Forum
October 19, 2018	Ōtsu	Japan	Biwako Hall
October 20, 2018	Kobe	Japan	Kobe Kokusai Hall
November 7, 2018	Osaka	Japan	Festival Hall
November 8, 2018	Osaka	Japan	Festival Hall
November 18, 2018	Hamamatsu	Japan	Act City Hamamatsu
November 23, 2018	Kōriyama	Japan	Kenshin Cultural Center
November 24, 2018	Morioka	Japan	Morioka Civic Cultural Hall
December 14, 2018	Osaka	Japan	Festival Hall
December 15, 2018	Osaka	Japan	Festival Hall
December 21, 2018	Kagoshima	Japan	Kagoshima Citizens' Culture Hall
December 23, 2018	Fukuoka	Japan	Fukuoka Sunpalace
December 24, 2018	Kumamoto	Japan	City Kaikan Sears Home Yume Hall
January 5, 2019	Niigata	Japan	Niigata Terrace
January 6, 2019	Toyama	Japan	Aubade Hall
January 12, 2019	Nagoya	Japan	Nagoya Congress Center
January 13, 2019	Nagoya	Japan	Nagoya Congress Center
January 19, 2019	Sendai	Japan	Sendai Sun Plaza
January 20, 2019	Nan'yō	Japan	Shelter Nanyo Hall
February 1, 2019	Shunan	Japan	Shunan Cultural Center
February 3, 2019	Masuda	Japan	Shimane Arts Center
February 11, 2019	Chiba	Japan	Chiba Prefectural Cultural Hall
February 14, 2019	Asahikawa	Japan	Asahikawa Civic Culture Hall
February 16, 2019	Sapporo	Japan	Sapporo Cultural Arts Theater hitaru
February 20, 2019	Tokyo	Japan	NHK Hall
March 1, 2019	Kochi	Japan	Kochi Prefectural Culture Hall
March 3, 2019	Naruto	Japan	Naruto Municipal Cultural Hall
March 8, 2019	Kanazawa	Japan	Mori Hall
March 9, 2019	Matsumoto	Japan	Matsumoto Civic Art Center
March 22, 2019	Kitakyushu	Japan	Soleil Hall
March 23, 2019	Fukuoka	Japan	Fukuoka Sun Palace
Leg 4—Arena dates
April 26, 2019	Tokyo	Japan	Nippon Budokan
April 27, 2019	Tokyo	Japan	Nippon Budokan
April 28, 2019	Tokyo	Japan	Nippon Budokan

== Cancelled shows ==
Date	City	Country	Venue	Reason
September 30, 2018	Chiba	Japan	Chiba Prefectural Cultural Hall	Typhoon Trami
