= Holiday (Misia song) =

Promotional single by Misia

from the album Super Best Records: 15th Celebration
- Released: January 30, 2013
- Genre: Synth-pop
- Length: 3:50
- Label: Ariola Japan
- Songwriters: Misia; Kenji Hayashida

Music video
- "Holiday" on YouTube

"Holiday" (stylized as "HOLIDAY") is a song recorded by Japanese singer Misia, from her fourth compilation album Super Best Records: 15th Celebration. It was released digitally as a promotional single by Ariola Japan on January 30, 2013. The song was written by Misia, composed by Kenji Hayashida and arranged by DJ Gomi.

== Background and release ==
"Holiday" was released to digital download, exclusively on iTunes, on March 19, 2014, three weeks before the release of Super Best Records: 15th Celebration. The song was used in television commercials for the Toyota Isis, starting October 24, 2012. A music video for the song, starring Ema Fujisawa and Kensei Mikami, was written and directed by Ellie Omiya.

== Chart performance ==
"Holiday" charted at number 51 on the Billboard Japan Adult Contemporary Airplay chart.

== Charts ==
Chart (2013)	Peak position
Japan Adult Contemporary Airplay (Billboard)	51
