= Misia Remix 2003 Kiss in the Sky: Non Stop Mix =

Remix album by Misia
- Released: April 23, 2003
- Genre: House, hip hop
- Length: 95:27
- Label: Rhythmedia Tribe

Misia chronology
| Kiss in the Sky Kanzenban Limited Edition (2002) | Misia Remix 2003 Kiss in the Sky: Non Stop Mix (2003) | Hoshizora no Live: The Best of Acoustic Ballade (2003) |

Misia Remix 2003 Kiss in the Sky: Non Stop Mix is Misia's fourth remix album, released on April 23, 2003. It sold 31,648 copies in its first week and peaked at #3. Disc one is mixed by DJ Ta-shi whilst the second disc is mixed by DJ Gomi.

The album is certified Gold for shipment of 100,000 copies.

== Track listing ==
Disc one (Floor 1: Non Stop Mixed by DJ Ta-shi for Beatknuckles)
| No. | Title | Remixer(s) | Length |
|---|---|---|---|
| 1. | "Back Blocks (So So Def Remix)" | Jermaine Dupri | 4:59 |
| 2. | "Over Bit (Human Rhythm Remix)" | Human Rhythm | 5:36 |
| 3. | "Don't Stop Music! (Mega Raiders Remix)" | Mega Raiders | 4:05 |
| 4. | "Laila (Mega Raiders Remix)" | Mega Raiders | 5:01 |
| 5. | "Mekubase no Burūsu (DJ Watarai Remix) (めくばせのブルース (DJ WATARAI Remix))" | DJ Watarai | 4:22 |
| 6. | "Back Blocks (Mega Raiders Remix)" | Mega Raiders | 3:43 |
| 7. | "Back Blocks (DJ Spinna Remix)" | DJ Spinna | 1:50 |
| 8. | "Destiny's Rule (Moments Of Soul Remix)" | Moments Of Soul | 4:53 |
| 9. | "Laila (So So Def Remix)" | Jermaine Dupri | 4:45 |

Disc two (Floor 2: Non Stop Mixed by DJ Gomi for Rhythmedia)
| No. | Title | Remixer(s) | Length |
|---|---|---|---|
| 1. | "Nemurenu Yoru wa Kimi no Sei (The Sacred Rhythm Classical Salsa Version) (眠れぬ夜は君のせい (The Sacred Rhythm Classical Salsa Version))" | Joe Claussell | 10:44 |
| 2. | "Shining Star (DJ Spinna Remix)" | DJ Spinna | 6:40 |
| 3. | "Koiuta (Yoruba Soul Remix) (恋唄 (Yoruba Soul Remix))" | Osunlade | 7:31 |
| 4. | "Fly Away (Malawi Rocks Remix)" | Malawi Rocks | 7:25 |
| 5. | "Taiyou ga Iru Kara (Classic 12" Mix) (太陽がいるから (Classic 12" Mix))" | Frankie Knuckles | 6:50 |
| 6. | "Tobikata wo Wasureta Chiisana Tori (Malawi Rocks Remix) (飛び方を忘れた小さな鳥 (Malawi Rocks Remix))" | Malawi Rocks | 5:46 |
| 7. | "Hatenaku Tsuzuku Sutōrī (Hex Hector Remix) (果てなく続くストーリー (Hex Hector Remix))" | Hex Hector | 6:38 |
| 8. | "Always (Gomi's Lair Club Mix)" | DJ Gomi | 8:39 |

== Charts ==
=== Oricon Sales Chart ===
| Release | Chart | Peak position | First day/week sales | Sales total |
|---|---|---|---|---|
| April 23, 2003 | Oricon Daily Albums Chart | 3 | | |
| April 23, 2003 | Oricon Weekly Albums Chart | 3 | 31,648 | 70,334 |
| April 23, 2003 | Oricon Monthly Albums Chart | 5 | | |

=== Physical Sales Charts ===
| Chart | Peak position |
|---|---|
| Oricon Daily Albums Chart | 3 |
| Oricon Weekly Albums Chart | 3 |
| Oricon Monthly Albums Chart | 5 |
| Soundscan Albums Chart (CD-Only) | 5 |
