= Misia Remix 2002 World Peace =

Remix album by Misia
- Released: November 21, 2001
- Genre: House
- Length: 98:51
- Label: Arista Japan

Misia chronology
Marvelous (2001)	Misia Remix 2002 World Peace (2001)	Misia Greatest Hits (2002)

Misia Remix 2002 World Peace is Misia's third remix album, released on November 21, 2001. It sold 165,190 copies in its first week and peaked at #3. Misia Remix 2002 World Peace features Erick Morillo's first remix for a Japanese artist.

== Track listing ==
Disc one
No.	Title	Remixer(s)	Length
1.	"Everything (Junior + Gomi Club Extended Mix)"	Junior Vasquez	12:09
2.	"Close to My Heart (Ano Natsu no Mama de) (Erick Morillo Vocal Mix) (CLOSE TO MY HEART (あの夏のままで) (Erick Morillo Vocal Mix))"	Erick Morillo	8:19
3.	"Rhythm Reflection (Mega Raiders Remix)"	Mega Raiders	4:05
4.	"Escape (DJ Watarai Remix)"	DJ Watarai	5:19
5.	"Sunny Day (Shinichi Osawa Remix)"	Shinichi Osawa	5:30
6.	"I Miss You: Toki wo Koete (Gomi's Lair Club Mix) (I miss you～時を越えて～ (Gomi's Lair Club Mix))"	Gomi	11:05

Disc two
No.	Title	Remixer(s)	Length
1.	"Sunny Day (Joe Claussell Sunny Vocal Mix)"	Joe Claussell	8:07
2.	"Toki wo Tomete (Malawi Rocks Sunshine Mix) (時をとめて (Malawi Rocks Sunshine Mix))"	Malawi Rocks	8:14
3.	"La La La (Original K Dope Mix)"	Kenny Dope	5:04
4.	"Change for Good (Mega Raiders Remix)"	Mega Raiders	5:00
5.	"Nocturne (Modaji Remix)"	Modaji	6:44
6.	"Everything (Hex Hector's Club Mix)"	Hex Hector	10:56
7.	"Mega Misia (Mega Raiders Mix)"	Mega Raiders	6:59

== Charts ==
=== Oricon Sales Chart ===
Release	Chart	Peak position	First day/week sales	Sales total
November 21, 2001	Oricon Daily Albums Chart	3		
November 21, 2001	Oricon Weekly Albums Chart	3	165,190	332,510
November 21, 2001	Oricon Monthly Albums Chart	7		
November 21, 2001	Oricon Yearly Albums Chart	80		

=== Physical sales charts ===
Chart	Peak position
Oricon Daily Albums Chart	3
Oricon Weekly Albums Chart	3
Oricon Monthly Albums Chart	7
Soundscan Albums Chart (CD-Only)	3
