= Kimi no Soba ni Iru yo =

Single by Misia

from the album Life Is Going On and On
- Released: November 29, 2017
- Recorded: August 31, 2017
- Genre: Pop; electropop; R&B
- Length: 4:00
- Label: Ariola Japan
- Songwriters: Misia; Ichi; Mayu Wakisaka
- Producer: Ichi

Misia singles chronology
"Super Rainbow" (2016)	"Kimi no Soba ni Iru yo" (2017)	"Ai no Katachi" (2018)

Music video
- "Kimi no Soba ni Iru yo" on YouTube

"Kimi no Soba ni Iru yo" (君(きみ)のそばにいるよ; lit. "I'll Be There") is a song recorded by Japanese singer Misia. It is the theme song of the 2017 Warner Bros. Pictures live action film Fullmetal Alchemist. The song was written by Misia, with lyrics that portray the brotherly bond between the two main characters, Edward and Alphonse, and composed by Los Angeles–based Japanese musician Ichi, and Mayu Wakisaka.

== Background and composition ==
The track, which was initially submitted to Misia five years prior, was reworked by Misia and Ichi specifically with the film in mind. On September 26, 2017, it was announced that Misia had recorded the song for the film and that it would be released on November 29, 2017, in the same week as the film. "Kimi no Soba ni Iru yo" is written in the key of E-flat minor with a common time tempo of 128 beats per minute. Misia's vocals span from F_{3} to C♯_{5} in modal voice, and up to E♭_{5} in head voice.

== Music video ==
Following the release announcement, an accompanying music video, directed by Fullmetal Alchemist director Fumihiko Sori, was filmed at Toho Studios and premiered through Misia's YouTube channel on November 24, 2017.

== Chart performance ==
"Kimi no Soba ni Iru yo" debuted on the daily Oricon Singles Chart at number 27. It ranked at number 37 on the weekly Oricon Singles Chart, selling 2,000 copies in its first week. The single charted for three weeks and sold a reported total of 3,000 copies.

== Track listing ==
All tracks are written by Misia, Ichi and Mayu Wakisaka.

No.	Title	Producer(s)	Length
1.	"Kimi no Soba ni Iru yo" (君のそばにいるよ, "I'll Be There")	Ichi	4:00
2.	"Kimi no Soba ni Iru yo" (DJ Emma Remix)	DJ Emma	6:29
3.	"Kimi no Soba ni Iru yo" (Original Instrumental)	Ichi	4:00
4.	"Kimi no Soba ni Iru yo" (DJ Emma Dub)	DJ Emma	6:29
5.	"Kimi no Soba ni Iru yo" (Nude Dub)	DJ Shimoyama; DJ Emma	6:12
Total length:			27:11

== Charts ==
Chart (2017)	Peak position	Sales
Japan Weekly Singles (Oricon)	37	3,000
Japan Hot 100 (Billboard)	21	3,000
Japan Download Songs (Billboard)	16	3,000
Japan Streaming Songs (Billboard)	39	3,000
Japan Top Singles Sales (Billboard)	37	3,000
Japan Weekly Singles (RecoChoku)	5	3,000
Japan Weekly Singles (Mora)	12	3,000
