= Back in Love Again (Misia song) =

Single by Misia featuring Tomoyasu Hotei

from the album Super Best Records: 15th Celebration
- Released: December 19, 2012
- Studio: Victor Studio; Sony Music Studios; Rmt Studio
- Genre: Pop; rock
- Length: 4:34
- Label: Ariola Japan
- Songwriter(s): Misia; Tomoyasu Hotei
- Producer(s): Tohru Shigemi

Misia singles chronology
| "Deepness" (2012) | "Back in Love Again" (2012) | "Maware Maware" (2013) |

Tomoyasu Hotei singles chronology
| "Don't Give Up!" (2012) | "Back in Love Again" (2012) | "Arashigaoka" (2013) |

"Back in Love Again" is a song recorded by Japanese singer Misia. It was written by Misia and composed and produced by Japanese musician Tomoyasu Hotei, who is featured on the track as guitarist. "Back in Love Again" was released as a single by Ariola Japan on December 19, 2012. It served as theme song to the 2012 film Ōoku: Eien - Emonnosuke / Tsunayoshi-hen, also known as The Castle of Crossed Destinies, in continuation with her previous single, "Deepness", which is the theme song to Oōku Tanjō - Arikoto / Iemitsu-hen, the film's prequel television drama.

== Background and release ==
"Back in Love Again" was released a little over a month following Misia's previous single, "Deepness". The first pressing of the physical release comes with a DVD featuring the song's music video and making-of, as well as an alternate cover artwork. The single includes a previously unreleased cover of The Outsiders theme song "Stay Gold" by Stevie Wonder, which Misia recorded for the soundtrack of the drama series Hatsukoi (2012), and a live rendition of the Bette Midler song "The Rose", recorded at the Misia Candle Night 2012 concert held at the Kawaguchiko Stellar Threater on August 26, 2012.

== Composition ==
"Back in Love Again" is written in the key of A major and set to a common time tempo of 70 beats per minute. Misia's vocals span from F♯_{3} to D_{5}. Misia stated that she wanted to create a rock ballad to match the film's theme of "last love". She likened the writing process with Hotei to "being in a stream of stimulation" and added that she was so overtaken by Hotei's skills on the guitar that she didn't want the recording session to end. Hotei spoke of performing with Misia as blissful due to her great vocal talent.

== Critical reception ==
Hotei received acclaim for the "dignified elegance" of his composition and for providing Misia's catalogue with a "fresh and exciting" type of ballad. Overall, CDJournal critics described the song as "heartrending" and praised Hotei for his standout guitar solo.

== Music video ==
The music video to "Back in Love Again" was co-directed by Mitsuo Shindō and Sayaka Nakane. Misia and Hotei both appear in the music video, performing the song surrounded by 3,000 carnations. Misia stated that when she first heard Hotei's demo for the song, she imagined a flower slowly blooming. Shindō and Nakane pulled inspiration from this first impression and decided on carnations specifically because its associated hanakotoba most matched the spirit of the song. The shots of Misia and Hotei singing and playing the guitar are interspersed with animated shots of birds and a couple dancing.

== Chart performance ==
"Back in Love Again" debuted at number 18 on the weekly Oricon Singles Chart, with 4,000 copies sold. It charted for four weeks and sold a reported total of 7,000 copies during its run.

== Track listing ==
| No. | Title | Writer(s) | Arranger(s) | Length |
|---|---|---|---|---|
| 1. | "Back in Love Again" (Misia featuring Tomoyasu Hotei) | Misia; Tomoyasu Hotei | Tohru Shigemi | 4:39 |
| 2. | "Stay Gold" | Stevie Wonder; Carmine Coppola | Shigemi | 2:20 |
| 3. | "The Rose" (Misia Candle Night Live) | Amanda McBroom | Shigemi | 3:39 |
| Total length: | | | | 10:40 |

Limited edition DVD
| No. | Title | Director(s) | Length |
|---|---|---|---|
| 1. | "Back in Love Again" (Music Video) | Mitsuo Shindō; Sayaka Nakane |
| 2. | "The Making of Back in Love Again" |

== Charts ==
| Chart (2012) | Peak position | Sales |
|---|---|---|
| Japan Weekly Singles (Oricon) | 18 | 7,000 |
| Japan Hot 100 (Billboard) | 12 | 7,000 |
| Japan Adult Contemporary Airplay (Billboard) | 12 | 7,000 |
| Japan Hot Top Airplay (Billboard) | 17 | 7,000 |
| Japan Hot Singles Sales (Billboard) | 14 | 7,000 |
