= Back Blocks =

Single by Misia

from the album Kiss in the Sky Kanzenban Limited Edition
- Released: November 20, 2002]
- Recorded: 2002
- Genre: R&B, J-Pop
- Length: 19:07
- Label: Rhythmedia Tribe
- Songwriters: Misia, Sakoshin, Yudai Suzuki

Misia singles chronology
"Nemurenu Yoru wa Kimi no Sei" (2002)	"Back Blocks" (2002)	"Kokoro Hitotsu" (2003)

Music video
- "Back Blocks" on YouTube

"Back Blocks" is Misia's 11th single. It was released on 20 November 2002. It peaked at #7 selling 30,846 copies in its first week. The third track, Tobikata wo Wasureta Chiisana Tori, serves as the theme song for the PlayStation 2 game Star Ocean: Till the End of Time.

== Track list ==
All lyrics are written by Misia.

No.	Title	Length
1.	"Back Blocks"	6:58
2.	"Mekubase no Blues (めくばせのブルース, Mekubase no Burūsu; Winking Blues)"	5:32
3.	"Laila (So So Def Remix)"	10:56
4.	"Tobikata wo Wasureta Chiisana Tori (Star Ocean version) (飛び方を忘れた小さな鳥; The Small Bird That Forgot How to Fly)"	5:18

== Charts ==
Release	hart	Peak position	Sales total	Chart run
20 November 2002	Oricon Daily Singles Chart	6		
20 November 2002	Oricon Weekly Singles Chart	7	63,106	9 weeks
20 November 2002	Oricon Monthly Singles Chart			
20 November 2002	Oricon Yearly Singles Chart			
