= Fullmetal Alchemist (film) =

- Theatrical release poster
- Kanji: 鋼の錬金術師
- Directed by: Fumihiko Sori
- Screenplay by: Fumihiko Sori; Takeshi Miyamoto
- Story by: Hiromu Arakawa
- Based on: Fullmetal Alchemist by Hiromu Arakawa
- Produced by: Yumihiko Yoshihara
- Starring: Ryosuke Yamada; Tsubasa Honda; Dean Fujioka; Ryuta Sato; Jun Kunimura; Fumiyo Kohinata; Yasuko Matsuyuki
- Cinematography: Keiji Hashimoto
- Edited by: Chieko Suzaki
- Music by: Reiji Kitasato
- Production companies: Square Enix; OXYBOT Inc.
- Distributed by: Warner Bros. Pictures (Japan); Netflix (International)
- Release date: 1 December 2017 (Japan)
- Running time: 135 minutes
- Country: Japan
- Language: Japanese
- Box office: $8 million

Fullmetal Alchemist (Japanese: 鋼の錬金術師, Hepburn: Hagane no Renkinjutsushi; lit. 'Alchemist of Steel') is a 2017 Japanese science fantasy action film directed by Fumihiko Sori, starring Ryosuke Yamada, Tsubasa Honda and Dean Fujioka and based on the manga series of the same name by Hiromu Arakawa, covering the first four volumes of the original storyline. It was released in Japan by Warner Bros. Pictures on 1 December 2017. The theme song of the film, "Kimi no Soba ni Iru yo", is performed by Misia. Two sequels were released in 2022: Fullmetal Alchemist: The Revenge of Scar and Fullmetal Alchemist: The Final Alchemy.

== Plot ==
In the country of Amestris, brothers Edward and Alphonse Elric live in a rural town with their mother Trisha while self-learning alchemy. When the brothers commit the taboo act of Human Transmutation to resurrect Trisha after she dies of illness, it backfires and they face the consequences via the Law of Equivalent Exchange: Edward loses his left leg, while Alphonse is dragged into the Gate of Truth. Edward sacrifices his right arm to save his brother's soul and bind it to a suit of armor. His missing limbs are replaced with "automail" prosthetics made by the town's automail mechanic whose granddaughter, Winry Rockbell, is the brothers' childhood friend.

Edward receives an invitation from Colonel Roy Mustang to join the military. After becoming the country's youngest State Alchemist with the title "Fullmetal Alchemist", he and Alphonse begin their quest to find the legendary Philosopher's Stone that can restore their bodies. Years later, the brothers, now teenagers, receive help from Major General Hakuro after another failed attempt to find the stone. Hakuro introduces them to Shou Tucker, a bio-alchemy authority who obtained his State Alchemist credentials by creating a talking chimera. Tucker points them to Dr. Tim Marcoh, who created a Philosopher's Stone prior to going into hiding.

When Edward and Winry find Marcoh, he is murdered by Lust, an assassin. Upon returning to the Tuckers' home, Edward and Alphonse are horrified to discover that Tucker has transmuted his young daughter Nina and his dog together to create a human talking chimera in a bid not to lose his State Alchemist credentials. They have Tucker arrested, though not before he tries to turn Alphonse against Edward, causing the brothers to fight. Edward and Mustang's close friend Major Maes Hughes makes a disturbing discovery from Marcoh's notes, but is killed by Lust's associate Envy. Using Marcoh's notes, Edward is led to the clandestine Fifth Laboratory, where he finds the now-insane Tucker holding Alphonse and Winry hostage. When Edward learns that Philosopher's Stones are unethically created from human lives, he has a breakdown, realizing he can no longer depend on that method.

Lust kills Tucker, revealing herself as a homunculus. Hakuro reveals himself as their partner, divulging that the military made Philosopher's Stones using human hostages. He activates a Mannequin Soldier homunculi army with the Stones but is killed by them. As the military destroys the Mannequins, Mustang kills Lust and tears out the Philosopher's Stone that was powering her body. He gives Edward the stone so he can restore Alphonse but the brothers refuse, now knowing how they are made. Instead, Edward uses the stone to appear before his brother's corporeal body at the Gate of Truth and promises to find another way to restore him.

In a mid-credit scene, Envy is revealed to have survived Mustang's attack as its true parasitic form escapes from its human body's charred remains.

== Cast ==
Character	Actor	English dubbing
Edward Elric	Ryosuke Yamada, Rai Takahashi (Young)	Vic Mignogna, Kristine De Los Santos (Young)
Alphonse Elric	Atomu Mizuishi, Seiru (Young)	Aaron Dismuke, Ryan Bartley (Young)
Winry Rockbell	Tsubasa Honda	Caitlin Glass
Roy Mustang	Dean Fujioka	Steve Phelan
Riza Hawkeye	Misako Renbutsu	Dana Powers
Maes Hughes	Ryuta Sato	Matt Mountjoy
Gracia Hughes	Natsuki Harada	Ryan Bartley
Maria Ross	Natsuna Watanabe	Lilly Grand
Tim Marcoh	Jun Kunimura	Paul St. Peter
Envy	Kanata Hongō	Brian Timothy Anderson
Lust	Yasuko Matsuyuki	Caitlyn Elizabeth
Gluttony	Shinji Uchiyama	Mark Allen Jr.
Trisha Elric	Kaoru Hirata	Lilly Grand
Father Cornello	Kenjirō Ishimaru	Jamieson Price
Shou Tucker	Yo Oizumi (special appearance)	Lane Sandison
Nina Tucker	Mei Yokoyama	Rachel Luna
General Hakuro	Fumiyo Kohinata	Andrew Thacher
Truth		T.J. Lowe

== Production ==
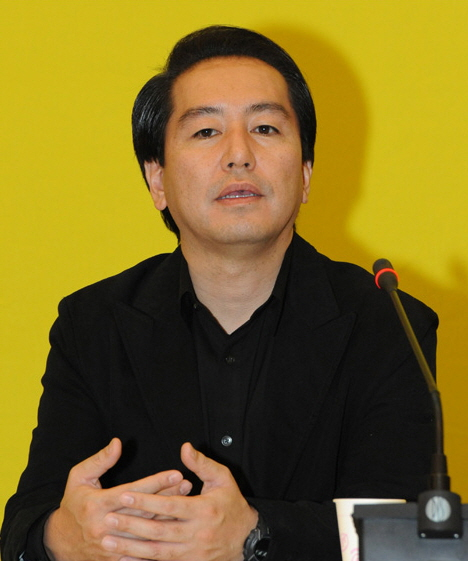
Director Fumihiko Sori

The film was originally planned to be produced in 2013 but because of low budget and also technology, it was delayed until it was officially announced for production in May 2016. According to the director's press conference in March 2017:

[S]ince the main characters are the two brothers, where there is Ed, there will always be Al. Even just based on that, the amount of CG used becomes enormous. In this work, I'm using a technology that was used in Hollywood movies such as The Avengers. We're using a lot [of] new techniques that were never used in Japanese movies before..."

Since the original story consists of 27 volumes, I cut it down in to two hours, but we will stay faithful to the manga. ... I don't plan to change the setting, the world view, and make a different story... Of course we will have the philosopher's stone...[in the story].

On adapting the source material, Fumihiko Sori said, "I want to create a style that follows the original manga as much as possible. The cast is entirely Japanese, but the cultural background is Europe. However, it's a style that doesn't represent a specific race or country." Regarding the faithfulness of the adaptation, which has characters of non-Japanese ethnicity, the director said, "There will never be a scene in which a character says something that would identify him/her as Japanese."

Sori told Oricon he has a deep affection for the story that tells the "truth of living," and said, "It is my dearest wish to turn this wonderful story into a film, and it is not an exaggeration to say that I am living for this reason." He added that he "wants to create a wonderful film that uses techniques that challenge Hollywood", and noted that nowadays Japanese filmmaking techniques have progressed greatly.

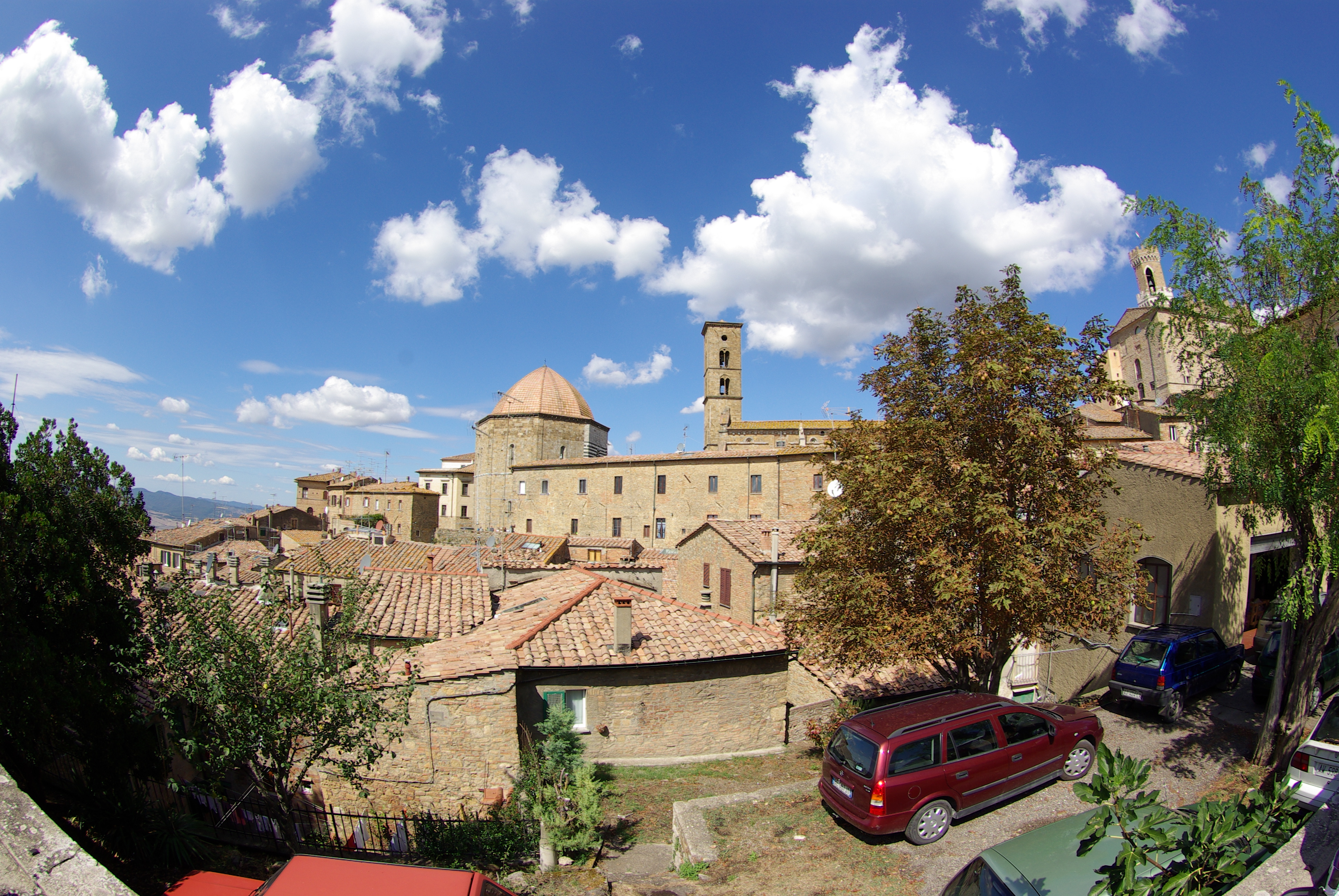
Filming was spotted in June 2016 in the Italian town of Volterra

Principal photography took place in Italy. Shooting was spotted in Volterra (identified as Reole from 06:53 to 12:54) on the first week of June and some scenes continued filming in Japan from June and finished on 26 August 2016.

Japanese VFX company OXYBOT inc. provided the visual effects for the film. The first teaser visual was unveiled on 31 December 2016. The updated version with the 2017 New Year Greetings were unveiled on the following day with the text "Happy New Year". In February 2017, they unveiled the release date of 1 December, with the CG appearance of Alphonse

On 19 February 2018, the film released on Netflix as a Netflix Original Film. Notably, in the English-language dub voice actors Vic Mignogna, Aaron Dismuke, and Caitlin Glass reprised their roles as Edward Elric, Alphonse Elric, and Winry Rockbell respectively from the Funimation dub of the Fullmetal Alchemist anime series.

== Reception ==
=== Critical response ===
The film received mostly mixed reviews. On the review aggregator website Rotten Tomatoes, 28% of 18 critics' reviews are positive, with an average rating of 4.8/10. On Metacritic, which assigns and normalizes scores of critic reviews, the film has a weighted average score of 48 out of 100 based on 5 critics, indicating "mixed or average reviews".

Deborah Young of The Hollywood Reporter wrote, "Massively augmented with advanced CG work that is a joy to behold, the film looks poised to sweep Asian markets beginning in December when Warner Bros. Japan releases domestically. But its exotically facetious tone, cultural confusion... and reckless narrative gaps will keep newbies to the story at a distance." The Daily Telegraph's Robbie Collin gave the film 2/5 stars, writing, "Conservative fans might appreciate its craven faithfulness, but adaptation isn't much fun when it's just approximation, and Fullmetal Alchemist behaves less like cinema than cosplay on a cinema budget." Variety's Richard Kuipers said the film "proves to be a mixed bag of eye-catching visuals and uneven storytelling – rushed and choppy at times, and draggy and repetitive at others."

Theron Martin of Anime News Network gave the film a grade of B−, writing, "Overall, the movie fares better and would probably score higher with fans if viewed strictly as an extension of the established franchise. However, it suffers from enough explanatory gaps and other flaws that it can't be considered a success as a standalone project." Kaori Shoji of IGN gave it a score of 6.5/10, saying, "Overall, Fullmetal Alchemist has some good things going for it, but needs to fix the leaks and sputtering in the narrative's engine."

=== Other responses ===
Prior to the film's release, Seiji Mizushima, the director of the first Fullmetal Alchemist anime adaptation, criticized the decision to only use Japanese actors, but expressed interest in seeing the CGI featured in the trailer looked in the final film and how it handled the manga's story.

== Sequels ==
In July 2017, Sori and Yamada said a sequel was in development. In early March 2022, it was announced that two sequels would be released during the year: Fullmetal Alchemist: The Revenge of Scar (鋼の錬金術師 完結編 – 復讐者スカー, Hagane no Renkinjutsushi: Kanketsu-hen – Fukushūsha Scar) and Fullmetal Alchemist: The Final Alchemy (最後の錬成, Hagane no Renkinjutsushi: Kanketsu-hen – Saigo no Rensei), with Mackenyu playing the role of Scar. They were released on 20 May and 24 June respectively. They became available on Netflix on 20 August and 24 September respectively.
