= Mars & Roses =

Studio album by Misia
- Released: February 11, 2004
- Recorded: 2003
- Genre: R&B, pop
- Length: 58:41
- Label: Rhythmedia Tribe; Avex Trax
- Producer: Keith Crouch

Misia chronology
Misia Single Collection: 5th Anniversary (2003)	Mars & Roses (2004)	Misia Love & Ballads: The Best Ballade Collection (2004)

Mars & Roses is the fifth studio album by Japanese R&B singer Misia, released on February 11, 2004. It debuted at #3 with 151,087 copies sold. The album was recorded in London, New York and Tokyo. The song Little Rose, the title and theme of the album were inspired by Antoine de Saint-Exupéry's The Little Prince. Mars & Roses was produced by American songwriter Keith Crouch and includes a duet with Erykah Badu. The first pressing of the album includes a bonus live version of "Snow Song", whose simple piano arrangement was created by Misia's band leader and pianist, Tohru Shigemi, during one of their tour rehearsals.

The album is certified Platinum for shipment of 250,000 copies.

== Information ==
=== London recordings ===
The first recordings for Mars & Roses took place in London, where the single "Kokoro Hitotsu" was recorded, with the assistance of the London Philharmonic Orchestra. The B-side, "Namida no Present", was penned by Misia and depicts a movie-like scene. After reading the lyrics, Shiro Sagisu composed the melody, which revolves around the sound of a camera shutter.

"Diamond" was also recorded in London. After hearing about how the studio they were using was once a stable, Misia came up with lyrics that resembled the story of a Western. The line "Kasanaru renga wa meiro no yō" (重なるレンガは迷路のよう, (These) overlapping bricks are like a maze) refers directly to the scenery she witnessed outside a window of the building.

=== New York recordings ===
Misia also recorded a slew of songs with Keith Crouch in New York. The first songs recorded were "Snow Song" and "Challenger", however upon hearing a demo of "In My Soul", Misia was adamant about recording it too. She wrote lyrics about the "time axis" and how, much like the Big Bang fashioned the universe, chance encounters can give birth to love. "Snow Song" was inspired by the snowy landscapes of Tokyo.

"Challenger", which features a percussion ending, is described by Crouch as being "like a match", with lyrics that tell the story of a "fighting girl in love". "Sunshine" was another demo by Crouch, in which he himself takes part in the chorus. The song tells the story of a boy who gives a girl a ride on the back of his bicycle to go see the morning sun.

"Akai Inochi" is a duet with Erykah Badu (whom Misia affectionately refers to as the voice of Mother Earth). The idea to team up both singers for a song was first brought up by Broderick D. Morris in May 2003, after introducing them to each other while they were both recording in New York. Badu contributed to the chorus and ad lib of "Akai Inochi", an anti-war song which speaks about how the events of 9/11 turned the "seemingly distant existence of war into the reality of now".

=== Japan recordings ===
The song "Little Rose", penned and composed by Misia, was inspired by the famous "important things in life are sometimes visible only to the heart" message from the novel, The Little Prince. Misia's demo, which was initially a slower mid tempo ballad, was rearranged by Sakoshin to give it a more upbeat and overall "happy" feel.

Mars & Roses includes Misia's first interlude since the 2001 album, "Marvelous". Composed by Sakoshin, "Interlude: When Misia was 7" samples recordings of 7 year old Misia's voice, credited as Little Misia. Sakoshin also made his first foray into songwriting for this album, co-writing the lyrics of "Groovin'", which are about "being able to express yourself in as many ways as possible". "Eyes on Me" is another song produced by Misia herself. She explained, "During my last tour, melodies would come to me in my sleep, and that's how "Eyes on Me" came about". To her demand, the song features the use of the Spanish guitar, performed by Kazumi Watanabe.

== Track listing ==
No.	Title	Lyrics	Music	Length
1.	"In My Soul"	Misia	Keith Crouch, Misia	4:29
2.	"Sunshine"	Misia	K. Crouch, Misia	4:36
3.	"Snow Song"	Misia	K. Crouch	4:59
4.	"Little Rose"	Misia	Misia	4:52
5.	"Interlude: When Misia was 7"		Sakoshin	1:07
6.	"Groovin'"	Misia, Sakoshin	Sakoshin	4:19
7.	"Eyes on Me"	Misia	Misia	4:44
8.	"Challenger"	Misia	K. Crouch, Misia	4:59
9.	"Namida no Present" (涙のプレゼント Namida no Purezento, "Present of Tears")	Misia	Shirō Sagisu	4:59
10.	"Diamond"	Misia, Mash	S. Sagisu	4:36
11.	"Akai Inochi feat. Erykah Badu" (赤い命, "Red Destiny")	Misia	Tomohiro Gondo	4:52
12.	"Kokoro Hitotsu" (心ひとつ, "One Heart")	Misia	S. Sagisu	4:38
13.	"Snow Song (Live Version)" (First Press Bonus Track)	Misia	K. Crouch	5:31

== Charts ==
=== Oricon Sales Chart ===
Release	Chart	Peak position	Debut sales	Sales total
February 11, 2004	Oricon Daily Albums Chart	1		249,719
February 11, 2004	Oricon Weekly Albums Chart	3	151,087	249,719
February 11, 2004	Oricon Monthly Albums Chart	4		249,719
February 11, 2004	Oricon Yearly Albums Chart	58		249,719
