= Sweetness (Misia song) =

Single by Misia

from the album Love Is the Message
- Released: 25 November 1999
- Recorded: 1999
- Genre: R&B, J-Pop
- Length: 16:36
- Label: Arista Japan
- Songwriter: Misia

Misia singles chronology
"Wasurenai Hibi" (1999)	"Sweetness" (1999)	"Escape" (2000)

Music video
- "Sweetness" on YouTube

"Sweetness" is Misia's 5th single. It was released on November 25, 1999 simultaneously with Wasurenai Hibi. It peaked at #7 selling 92,290 copies on its first week and went on to sell over 200,000 copies

The song's melody is similar to After 7's "Ready or Not".

== Track list ==
All lyrics are written by Misia.

No.	Title	Length
1.	"Sweetness"	5:53
2.	"Itoshii Hito (愛しい人; Beloved One)"	5:00
3.	"Wasurenai Hibi (Hex Hector's Radio Mix) (忘れない日々; Unforgettable Days)"	5:33

== Charts ==
Release	Chart	Peak position	Sales total	Chart run
25 November 1999	Oricon Daily Singles Chart	4		
25 November 1999	Oricon Weekly Singles Chart	7	226,130	8 weeks
25 November 1999	Oricon Monthly Singles Chart	11		
25 November 1999	Oricon Yearly Singles Chart			
