= Kiss in the Sky =

Album by Misia

Studio album by Misia
- Released: September 26, 2002
- Genre: R&B, J-pop
- Length: 66:05
- Label: Rhythmedia Tribe
- Producer: Misia

Misia chronology
Misia Greatest Hits (2002)	Kiss in the Sky (2002)	Kiss in the Sky Kanzenban Limited Edition (2002)

Singles from Kiss in the Sky
- 1. "Hatenaku Tsuzuku Story" Released: January 30, 2002; 2. "Nemurenu Yoru wa Kimi no Sei" Released: August 8, 2002

Kiss in the Sky is Misia's fourth studio album and first under Avex Trax subsidiary label Rhythmedia Tribe, released on September 26, 2002. It sold 410,060 copies in its first week and peaked at #1 for two consecutive weeks. Like her previous album, Marvelous, Kiss in the Sky was produced by Misia herself and features collaborations with B'z guitarist and leader, Tak Matsumoto.

== Track listing ==
No.	Title	Lyrics	Music	Length
1.	"Nemurenu Yoru wa Kimi no Sei" (眠れぬ夜は君のせい, "My Sleepless Nights Are Your Fault")	Misia	Ken Matsubara	5:22
2.	"Over Bit"	Misia	Jun Sasaki	5:01
3.	"Destiny's Rule"	Misia	Masahito Nakano	4:13
4.	"Laila"	Misia	Misia, Sakoshin	4:34
5.	"Koiuta" (恋唄, "Love Song")	Misia	Tak Matsumoto	4:19
6.	"Don't Stop Music!"	Misia	Tak Matsumoto	4:25
7.	"Fly Away"	Chihiro Close	Minoru Komorita	5:22
8.	"Always"	Misia	Jun Sasaki	5:33
9.	"Kaze ni Fukarete" (風に吹かれて, "Blown by the Wind")	Misia	Nobuyuki Shimizu	5:27
10.	"Hatenaku Tsuzuku Story" (果てなく続くストーリー Hatenaku Tsuzuku Sutōrī, "Never Ending Story")	Misia	Toshiaki Matsumoto	6:25
11.	"Shining Star"	Misia	Jun Sasaki	5:15
12.	"Taiyō ga Iru Kara" (太陽がいるから, "Because There's the Sun")	Misia	Nobuyuki Shimizu	5:30
13.	"Tobikata wo Wasureta Chiisana Tori" (飛び方を忘れた小さな鳥, "The Little Bird That Forgot How to Fly")	Misia	Yudai Suzuki	4:31

== Kiss in the Sky Kanzenban Limited Edition ==
Kiss in the Sky Kanzenban Limited Edition

Studio album by Misia
- Released: December 4, 2002
- Recorded: 2001–2002
- Genre: R&B, J-pop
- Length: 90:54
- Label: Rhythmedia Tribe
- Producer: Misia

Misia chronology
Kiss in the Sky (2002)	Kiss in the Sky Kanzenban Limited Edition (2002)	Misia Remix 2003 Kiss in the Sky: Non Stop Mix (2003)

Singles from Kiss in the Sky Kanzenban Limited Edition
- 1. "Back Blocks" Released: November 20, 2002

Kiss in the Sky Kanzenban Limited Edition is the limited re-release of Misia's fourth studio album, released on December 4, 2002. The album was re-released as a two-disc set coupling the album with the Back Blocks single due to Misia's wish to include Back Blocks (which was completed after the initial release date) in Kiss in the Sky.

== Track listing ==
Disc one
No.	Title	Lyrics	Music	Length
1.	"Nemurenu Yoru wa Kimi no Sei (眠れぬ夜は君のせい, My Sleepless Nights Are Your Fault)"	Misia	Ken Matsubara	5:22
2.	"Over Bit"	Misia	Jun Sasaki	5:01
3.	"Destiny's Rule"	Misia	Masahito Nakano	4:13
4.	"Laila"	Misia	Misia, Sakoshin	4:34
5.	"Koiuta (恋唄, Love Song)"	Misia	Tak Matsumoto	4:19
6.	"Don't Stop Music!"	Misia	Tak Matsumoto	4:25
7.	"Fly Away"	Chihiro Close	Minoru Komorita	5:22
8.	"Always"	Misia	Jun Sasaki	5:33
9.	"Kaze ni Fukarete (風に吹かれて, Blown by the Wind)"	Misia	Nobuyuki Shimizu	5:27
10.	"Hatenaku Tsuzuku Sutōrī (果てなく続くストーリー, Never Ending Story)"	Misia	Toshiaki Matsumoto	6:25
11.	"Shining Star"	Misia	Jun Sasaki	5:15
12.	"Taiyou ga Iru Kara (太陽がいるから, Because There's the Sun)"	Misia	Nobuyuki Shimizu	5:30
13.	"Tobikata wo Wasureta Chiisana Tori (飛び方を忘れた小さな鳥, The Small Bird Who's Forgotten How to Fly)"	Misia	Yudai Suzuki	4:31

Disc two
No.	Title	Lyrics	Music	Remixer(s)	Length
1.	"Back Blocks"	Misia	Sakoshin		5:23
2.	"Mekubase no Burūsu (めくばせのブルース, Winking Blues)"	Tiger	Sakoshin		4:13
3.	"Laila (So So Def Remix)"	Misia	Misia, Sakoshin	Jermaine Dupri	4:20
4.	"Tobikata wo Wasureta Chiisana Tori (Star Ocean Version) (飛び方を忘れた小さな鳥 (STAR OCEAN version))"	Misia	Yudai Suzuki		5:07
5.	"Back Blocks" (Enhanced Music Video)	Misia	Sakoshin

== Charts ==
=== Kiss in the Sky ===
Release	Chart	Peak Position	First Day/Week Sales	Sales Total	Chart Run
September 26, 2002	Oricon Daily Albums Chart	1			
September 26, 2002	Oricon Weekly Albums Chart	1	410,060	830,320	18 weeks
September 26, 2002	Oricon Monthly Albums Chart	1 (Oct); 7 (Nov)			
September 26, 2002	Oricon Yearly Albums Chart	14			

=== Kiss in the Sky Kanzenban Limited Edition ===
Release	Chart	Peak Position	First Day/Week Sales	Sales Total	Chart Run
December 4, 2002	Oricon Daily Albums Chart				
December 4, 2002	Oricon Weekly Albums Chart	22	13,204	33,193	7 weeks
December 4, 2002	Oricon Monthly Albums Chart				
December 4, 2002	Oricon Yearly Albums Chart				

=== Kiss in the Sky ===
Chart	Peak position
Oricon Daily Albums Chart	1
Oricon Weekly Albums Chart	1
Oricon Monthly Albums Chart	1
Soundscan Albums Chart (CD-Only)	1
