= In My Soul/Snow Song =

"In My Soul/Snow Song from Mars & Roses"

Single by Misia

from the album Mars & Roses
- Released: December 3, 2003
- Recorded: 2003
- Genre: R&B
- Length: 4:34 ("In My Soul"); 5:03 ("Snow Song")
- Label: Rhythmedia Tribe
- Songwriter: Misia
- Producer: Crouch

Misia singles chronology
"Kokoro Hitotsu" (2003)	"In My Soul/Snow Song from Mars & Roses" (2003)	"Namae no Nai Sora o Miagete" (2004)

Music video
- "In My Soul" on YouTube "Snow Song" on YouTube

"In My Soul/Snow Song from Mars & Roses" is the thirteenth single by Japanese recording artist Misia. It was released on December 3, 2003 as the second single from Misia's fifth studio album Mars & Roses.

== Chart performance ==
"In My Soul/Snow Song from Mars & Roses" debuted on the Oricon Daily Singles chart at number 8 on December 2, 2003 and climbed to number 5 two days later. The single peaked at number 7 on the Oricon Weekly Singles chart with 26,475 copies sold in its first week. It charted for nine weeks and sold a total of 48,669 copies.

== Track listing ==
All lyrics are written by Misia.

No.	Title	Music	Arranger(s)	Length
1.	"In My Soul"	Keith Crouch, Misia	Crouch	4:34
2.	"Snow Song"	Crouch	Crouch	5:03
3.	"In My Soul (Instrumental)"	Crouch, Misia	Crouch	4:34
4.	"Snow Song (Instrumental)"	Crouch	Crouch	5:01
Total length:				19:12

First press edition bonus tracks
No.	Title	Remixer(s)	Length
5.	"In My Soul (Mega Raiders Remix featuring Maccho for Ozrosaurus)"	Mega Raiders	4:29
6.	"Snow Song (DJ Watarai Remix)"	DJ Watarai	4:22
Total length:			28:07

DVD
No.	Title	Length
1.	"In My Soul (Video Clip)"
2.	"Snow Song (Video Clip)"

== Charts, certifications and sales ==
=== Charts ===
Chart (2003)	Peak position
Oricon Daily Singles	5
Oricon Weekly Singles	7
Oricon Monthly Singles	19
SoundScan Japan Weekly Singles	7

=== Certifications and sales ===
Country	Certifications	Sales
Japan	Gold	48,669

== Release history ==
Region	Date	Format	Label
Japan	December 3, 2003	CD, CD+DVD	Rhythmedia Tribe
Taiwan	December 3, 2003	CD, CD+DVD	Avex Taiwan
