= Kokoro Hitotsu =

Single by Misia

from the album Mars & Roses
- Released: 27 August 2003
- Recorded: 2003
- Genre: R&B, J-Pop
- Length: 24:14
- Label: Rhythmedia Tribe
- Songwriters: Misia, Shirō Sagisu

Misia singles chronology
"Back Blocks" (2002)	"Kokoro Hitotsu" (2003)	"In My Soul/Snow Song from Mars & Roses" (2003)

Music video
- "Kokoro Hitotsu" on YouTube

"Kokoro Hitotsu" (心ひとつ; lit. "One Heart") is Misia's 12th single. It was released on August 27, 2003. It peaked at #7 selling 36,771 copies in its first week. The song served as theme song for the movie Dragon Head, starring Satoshi Tsumabuki and Sayaka.

== Track list ==
All lyrics are written by Misia.

No.	Title	Length
1.	"Kokoro Hitotsu (心ひとつ; One Heart)"	4:40
2.	"Kokoro Hitotsu (DJ Gomi Remix) (心ひとつ (DJ Gomi Remix))"	4:41
3.	"Kokoro Hitotsu (DJ Gomi Anthem Remix) (心ひとつ (DJ Gomi Anthem Remix))"	4:57
4.	"Kokoro Hitotsu (Instrumental) (心ひとつ (Instrumental))"	4:40
5.	"Namida no Purezento (涙のプレゼント; A Present of Tears)"	4:59

== Charts ==
Release	Chart	Peak position	Sales total	Chart run
August 27, 2003	Oricon Daily Singles Chart	5		
August 27, 2003	Oricon Weekly Singles Chart	7	69,884	10 weeks
August 27, 2003	Oricon Monthly Singles Chart	14		
August 27, 2003	Oricon Yearly Singles Chart			
