= The Glory Day =

EP by Misia
- Released: November 21, 1998
- Recorded: September 1998
- Genre: R&B, gospel, J-pop
- Length: 50:36
- Label: Arista Japan
- Producer: Haruo Yoda, Misia

Misia chronology
| Mother Father Brother Sister (1998) | The Glory Day (1998) | Misia Remix 1999 (1999) |

The Glory Day is Misia's first mini-album, released on November 21, 1998. It sold 114,820 copies in its first week and peaked at #6. The Glory Day was recorded in London with the collaboration of a local gospel group.

== Track listing ==
| No. | Title | Lyrics | Music | Length |
|---|---|---|---|---|
| 1. | "Key of Love (Ai no Yukue)" (KEY OF LOVE ～愛の行方～, "Key of Love (Love's Whereabouts)") | Misia, Jun Sasaki | Jun Sasaki | 5:56 |
| 2. | "The Glory Day" | Misia, Mash | Shirō Sagisu | 8:35 |
| 3. | "Melody" | Misia | Hiroshi Matsui | 6:42 |
| 4. | "Into the Light" | Misia | Hiroshi Matsui | 6:20 |
| 5. | "Into the Light (Gomi's Beauty & Beast Mix)" | Misia | Hiroshi Matsui | 10:30 |
| 6. | "The Glory Day (The Special Day Mix)" | Misia, Mash | Shirō Sagisu | 6:27 |
| 7. | "Key of Love (Ai no Yukue) (Acoustic Club Soul Mix)" (KEY OF LOVE ～愛の行方～ (ACOUSTIC CRAB SOUL MIX)) | Misia, Jun Sasaki | Jun Sasaki | 5:48 |

== Charts ==
=== Oricon sales chart ===
| Release | Chart | Peak position | First week sales | Sales total |
|---|---|---|---|---|
| November 21, 1998 | Oricon Weekly Albums Chart | 6 | 114,820 | 748,390 |
| November 21, 1998 | Oricon Yearly Albums Chart | 174 (1998); 46 (1999) | | |
