= Wasurenai Hibi =

Single by Misia

from the album Love Is the Message
- Released: 25 November 1999
- Recorded: 1999
- Genre: R&B, J-Pop
- Length: 17:55
- Label: Arista Japan
- Songwriters: Misia, Toshiaki Matsumoto, Hiroshi Matsui

Misia singles chronology
"Believe" (1999)	"Wasurenai Hibi" (1999)	"Sweetness" (1999)

Music video
- "Wasurenai Hibi" on YouTube

"Wasurenai Hibi" (忘れない日々; lit. "Unforgettable Days") is Misia's 4th single. It was released on November 25, 1999 simultaneously with Sweetness. It peaked at #4 selling 119,630 copies on its first week. The song was used as the image song for Hitachi Maxell's "True Sound".

== Track list ==
All lyrics are written by Misia.

No.	Title	Length
1.	"Wasurenai Hibi (忘れない日々; Unforgettable Days)"	5:45
2.	"One!"	5:54
3.	"Itoshii Hito (Misia 1999 Live Version) (愛しい人; Beloved One)"	6:08

== Charts ==
Release	Chart	Peak position	Sales total	Chart run
November 25, 1999	Oricon Daily Singles Chart	3		
November 25, 1999	Oricon Weekly Singles Chart	4	403,350	10 weeks
November 25, 1999	Oricon Monthly Singles Chart	4		
November 25, 1999	Oricon Yearly Singles Chart	65		
