= Hatenaku Tsuzuku Story =

Single by Misia

from the album Kiss in the Sky
- Released: 30 January 2002
- Recorded: 2001
- Genre: R&B
- Length: 25:13
- Label: Rhythmedia Tribe
- Songwriter: Misia

Misia singles chronology
"I Miss You: Toki wo Koete" (2001)	"Hatenaku Tsuzuku Story" (2002)	"Nemurenu Yoru wa Kimi no Sei" (2002)

Music video
- "Hatenaku Tsuzuku Story" on YouTube

"Hatenaku Tsuzuku Story" (果てなく続くストーリー, Hatenaku Tsuzuku Sutōrī; lit. "Never Ending Story") is Misia's 9th single overall and first with Rhythmedia Tribe. It was released on January 30, 2002. It peaked at #3 selling 86,780 copies on its first week. The song served as opening theme to NHK's 2002 Salt Lake City Olympics TV report. Jane Zhang's recorded the Chinese version of this song (我的路) in her third album, Jane@Music. Sarah Geronimo has an English version of the song entitled "Love Can't Lie," on her album Sweet Sixteen.

== Track list ==
All lyrics are written by Misia.

No.	Title	Length
1.	"Hatenaku Tsuzuku Story (Original Mix) (果てなく続くストーリー, Hatenaku Tsuzuku Sutōrī; Never Ending Story)"	6:29
2.	"Hatenaku Tsuzuku Story (Disco 2002 Mix) (果てなく続くストーリー (Disco 2002 Mix))"	5:45
3.	"Hatenaku Tsuzuku Story (Smooth Latin Mix) (果てなく続くストーリー (Smooth Latin Mix))"	5:28
4.	"Hatenaku Tsuzuku Story (Hex Hector Remix) (果てなく続くストーリー (Hex Hector Remix))"	7:30

== Charts ==
Release	Chart	Peak position	Sales total	Chart run
30 January 2002	Oricon Daily Singles Chart	2		
30 January 2002	Oricon Weekly Singles Chart	3	181,210	7 weeks
30 January 2002	Oricon Monthly Singles Chart	5		
30 January 2002	Oricon Yearly Singles Chart	68		
