= Escape (Misia song) =

2000 song by Misia

Single by Misia

from the album Marvelous
- Released: July 7, 2000
- Recorded: 2000
- Genre: R&B
- Length: 16:53
- Label: BMG Japan
- Songwriter: Misia

Misia singles chronology
"Sweetness" (1999)	"Escape" (2000)	"Everything" (2000)

Music video
- "Escape" on YouTube

"Escape" is Misia's 6th single. It was released on 7 July 2000. It peaked at #7 selling 81,130 copies on its first week. It was used in a commercial for Kenwood's "Avino".

== Track list ==
All lyrics are written by Misia.

No.	Title	Length
1.	"Escape"	4:56
2.	"Change for Good"	5:48
3.	"Escape (Mega Raiders Remix)"	6:03

== Charts ==
Release	Chart	Peak position	Sales total	Chart run
July 7, 2000	Oricon Daily Singles Chart	2		
July 7, 2000	Oricon Weekly Singles Chart	7	257,610	11 weeks
July 7, 2000	Oricon Monthly Singles Chart	15		
July 7, 2000	Oricon Yearly Singles Chart	100		
