= Nemurenu Yoru wa Kimi no Sei =

Single by Misia

from the album Kiss in the Sky
- Released: 8 August 2002
- Recorded: 2002
- Genre: R&B, J-Pop
- Length: 16:15
- Label: Rhythmedia Tribe
- Songwriters: Misia, Ken Matsubara, Jun Sasaki

Misia singles chronology
"Hatenaku Tsuzuku Story" (2002)	"Nemurenu Yoru wa Kimi no Sei" (2002)	"Back Blocks" (2002)

Music video
- "Nemurenu Yoru wa Kimi no Sei" on YouTube

"Nemurenu Yoru wa Kimi no Sei" (眠れぬ夜は君のせい; lit. "My Sleepless Nights Are Your Fault") is Misia's 10th single. It was released on August 8, 2002. It reached #1, selling 128,630 copies in its first week. It was used as theme song for the drama "Ren'ai Hensachi" as well as in a commercial for Kirin's "Rakuda" beverage.

== Track list ==
All lyrics are written by Misia.

No.	Title	Length
1.	"Nemurenu Yoru wa Kimi no Sei (眠れぬ夜は君のせい; My Sleepless Nights Are Your Fault)"	5:24
2.	"Shining Star"	5:23
3.	"Nemurenu Yoru wa Kimi no Sei (Instrumental) (眠れぬ夜は君のせい (Instrumental))"	5:23

== Charts ==
Release	Chart	Peak position	Sales total	Chart run
8 August 2002	Oricon Daily Singles Chart	1		
8 August 2002	Oricon Weekly Singles Chart	1	322,361	12 weeks
8 August 2002	Oricon Monthly Singles Chart	5		
8 August 2002	Oricon Yearly Singles Chart	28		
