= Love Is the Message (Misia album) =

Studio album by Misia
- Released: January 1, 2000
- Recorded: 1999
- Genre: R&B, J-pop
- Length: 71:19
- Label: Arista Japan
- Producer: Haruo Yoda

Misia chronology
Misia Remix 1999 (1999)	Love Is the Message (2000)	Misia Remix 2000 Little Tokyo (2000)

Singles from Love Is the Message
- 1. "Believe" Released: April 21, 1999; 2. "Wasurenai Hibi" Released: November 25, 1999; 3. "Sweetness" Released: November 25, 1999

Love Is the Message is Misia's second studio album, released on January 1, 2000. It sold 1,349,650 copies in its first week, making it the 23rd highest debut in Japanese history, and peaked at #1 for two consecutive weeks. It went on to sell over 2.29 million copies, making Misia one of the three acts, alongside Globe and Chemistry, with the second most consecutive double million albums, behind Hikaru Utada. Love Is the Message was the recipient of the award for best album at the 42nd Japan Record Awards. The album jacket was shot during sunrise at the summit of the Haleakala National Park in Maui, Hawaii. Love Is the Message is the 56th best-selling album of all time in Japan.

== Track listing ==
No.	Title	Lyrics	Music	Length
1.	"Opening"			0:35
2.	"Believe"	Misia	Jun Sasaki	4:50
3.	"Sweetness"	Misia	Satoshi Shimano	5:50
4.	"It's Just Love"	Misia	Misia, Satoshi Shimano	6:25
5.	"Sweet Pain"	Misia	Kyōhei Tsutsumi	6:22
6.	"Atsui Namida" (アツイナミダ, "Hot Tears")	Misia	Jun Sasaki	6:26
7.	"Ame no Nichiyōbi" (雨の日曜日, "Rainy Sunday")	Chihiro Close, Misia	Tatsushi Kusunoki	4:47
8.	"Itoshii Hito" (愛しい人, "My Beloved")	Misia	Misia	6:31
9.	"Ano Hi no Yō ni" (あの日のように, "Like on That Day")	Misia	Misia	5:32
10.	"Hana/Tori/Kaze/Tsuki" (花／鳥／風／月, "Flower/Bird/Wind/Moon")	Chihiro Close	Hiroshi Matsui, Misia	5:48
11.	"One!"	Misia	Hiroshi Matsui	6:09
12.	"Wasurenai Hibi" (忘れない日々, "Unforgettable Days")	Misia	Toshiaki Matsumoto	5:56
13.	"Lovin' You (Misia 1999 Live Version)"	Richard J. Rudolph, Minnie Ripperton	Richard J. Rudolph, Minnie Ripperton	6:08

== Charts ==
=== Oricon Sales Chart ===
Release	Chart	Peak position	First week sales	Sales total
January 1, 2000	Oricon Daily Albums Chart	1		
January 1, 2000	Oricon Weekly Albums Chart	1	1,349,650	2,297,880
January 1, 2000	Oricon Monthly Albums Chart	1		
January 1, 2000	Oricon Yearly Albums Chart	4 (2000); 169 (2001)		
