= Mother Father Brother Sister =

Studio album by Misia
- Released: June 24, 1998
- Recorded: 1997–1998
- Studios: Sound Inn Studio; Sol Studio; Studio Vincent
- Genres: R&B, pop
- Length: 69:57
- Label: Arista Japan
- Producers: Haruo Yoda, Hiroto Tanigawa

Misia chronology
Mother Father Brother Sister (1998)	The Glory Day (1998)

Singles from Mother Father Brother Sister
- 1. "Tsutsumikomu Yō ni..." Released: February 21, 1998; 2. "Hi no Ataru Basho" Released: May 21, 1998

Mother Father Brother Sister is the debut studio album by Japanese singer and songwriter Misia, released on June 24, 1998, by Arista Japan. It was produced by Haruo Yoda and Hiroto Tanigawa and recorded between 1997 and 1998. Mother Father Brother Sister is commonly noted as being one of the first mainstream Japanese pop albums to incorporate elements of African-American music such as soul music, gospel, and contemporary R&B.

Mother Father Brother Sister was positively reviewed by music critics, who praised Misia's vocal performance and the record's compositions. Commercially, the record found massive success in Japan, reaching number one on the Oricon Albums Chart and earning a double million certification by the Recording Industry Association of Japan (RIAJ) for selling over two million copies nationwide. The album is the seventh best-selling debut album of all time in Japan, and the country's 38th best-selling album overall. It won the Best Album Award at the 40th Japan Record Awards at the end of the same year.

Mother Father Brother Sister spawned two singles, "Tsutsumikomu Yō ni..." and "Hi no Ataru Basho." Both the singles performed well in Japan, with the former becoming one of Misia's signature songs. The album is retrospectively seen as paving the way for bringing R&B into the Japanese mainstream, and is seen as one of the most important debut albums in the history of the Japanese music industry.

== Background ==
After being entranced by Lauryn Hill on the movie Sister Act 2: Back in the Habit (1993) at sixteen, Misia received vocal lessons from an African-American voice tutor and began performing at clubs in her hometown and in Tokyo. After graduating from high school in 1997, she moved to Tokyo and applied for various auditions and sent documents to record companies in order to become a singer. At age 18, Misia was scouted by Haruo Yoda at an audition in Kyushu. Yoda wanted to give her a stage name; Jun Sasaki, who worked on the album, wrote "To Misha-chan" on the tape of a song he was making, twisting her real name, and Yoda thought "Misha would be a good name." The stage name at first was Mishia, but Yoda didn't like how it was spelled, so the spelling was rearranged into Misia so the "I"s would be symmetrical.

== Composition ==
Mother Father Brother Sister is one of the first albums in mainstream Japanese pop music that incorporates many elements of African-American music such as soul music, gospel, and contemporary R&B. When this album was released, Japan was in the midst of the third band boom, and the top sellers were rock bands such as B'z, Glay, L'Arc~en~Ciel, and Luna Sea; the only popular artist who leaned toward R&B was Namie Amuro, but her fourth album, Concentration 20 (1997), is said to have a strong rock and electronic flavor. Mother Father Brother Sister includes the album version of the first single "Tsutsumikomu Youni..." and the second single "Hi no Ataru Basho" as well as their respective B-side songs. At the beginning of the sixth and tenth tracks, the end of the previous track can be heard for a few seconds.

"Never Gonna Cry! Strings Overture" is a instrumental string version of "Never Gonna Cry!" that lasts for approximately 53 seconds. "K.I.T" is a dance tune that features a huge display of whistle notes. "Koisuru Kisetsu" is a medium-tempo number that expresses the hope that fills the heart and the yearning love that hints at a bit of anxiety through the soft, sad strumming of an acoustic guitar. "I'm Over Here (Kizuite)" is a sad love song with a club-friendly R&B sound and careful singing style. "Tell Me" is a Western-style love song with an off-beat rhythm that creates a unique groove. "Kiss-shite Dakishimete" is a melancholic love ballad with vocals blending with the sound of an acoustic guitar and soft harmonica tones.

"Cry" is a funky, jazzy breakup song. "Chiisana Koi" is a love song with a soulful feel, featuring a pop melody, rhythmic and sad lyrics. "Hi no Ataru Basho" is a groovy funk song with a jazz-funk intro. "Hoshi no Furu Oka" is a power ballad with strings, piano, and brass. "Tsutsumikomu You ni... (Dave "EQ3" Dub Mix)" is a gentle medium-tempo ballad that is a dub mix of her debut song. "Never Gonna Cry!" is a pop tune with lyrics entirely in English. The album ends with the Junior Vasquez Remix Radio Edition of the previous track.

== Release and artwork ==
Mother Father Brother Sister was released by Arista Japan on June 24, 1998. The record was also released in Taiwan by BMG Music Taiwan Inc., with the Taiwanese edition containing a Misia mini poster with Chinese track listing on the back and an extra CD-Case with Misia postcards. Misia went to Hawaii to take photos for the jackets of her second single "Hi no Ataru Basho" and first album Mother Father Brother Sister. This was Misia's third trip overseas, following her visit to New York last year for recording. The album artwork for Mother Father Brother Sister was photographed by Yoshie Tominaga, with Toshiyuki Shinke designing its booklet. The artwork depicts Misia sitting on a tree while wearing a red t-shirt and a pair of red pants. The album was re-released in Super Audio CD hybrid format on December 3, 2003.

== Promotion ==
=== Singles and other songs ===
Mother Father Brother Sister spawned two singles. "Tsutsumikomu Yō ni..." was released as Misia's debut single on February 21, 1998, in three formats: a 8 cm mini CD single, a 12 cm CD single, and a 12-inch vinyl limited to 5,000 copies. The 8 cm version peaked at number eleven on the Oricon Singles Chart, while the 12 cm version peaked at number twenty. "Tsutsumikomu Yō ni..." was also used as the Elle Seine commercial song. The Oricon Singles Chart began counting 8 cm and 12 cm versions together in May 2001, and if the 8 cm and 12 cm versions were combined, "Tsutsumikomu Yō ni..." would have reached a peak of eighth place (4 weeks in a row) after entering the top ten in its tenth week since its release.

"Hi no Ataru Basho" was released as Misia's second single on May 21, 1998, as an 8 cm CD single, and a 12-inch vinyl. It was used as an insert song for the film Hood and as Nippon TV's Dotch Cooking Show ending theme, while its B-side, "Koisuru Kisetsu" was used as the Elle Seine commercial song and the opening theme for TV Tokyo's Breakbeats. The single peaked at number nine on the weekly Oricon chart in its fifth week on the chart.

=== Live performances ===
Misia promoted the album with a series of live performances and appearances throughout Japan. On March 3, 1998, her live debut was held at Harlem, a very popular nightclub at the time in Maruyamachō, Shibuya, in front of an audience of 1,200. From September to November 1998, Misia embarked on the Mother Father Brother Sister Tour ’98, performing at nearly thirty clubs and concert halls. Misia performed at school festivals at six universities from October to November 1998, with the first outdoor live show at Kwansei Gakuin University's special outdoor stage attracting ten thousand spectators. On December 2, 1998, nine months after her debut, Misia performed at the Nippon Budokan.

== Critical reception ==
Professional ratings
Review scores
Source	Rating
Sputnikmusic	5/5 stars
CDJournal	(positive)

Mother Father Brother Sister received positive reviews from music critics. The album received a glowing retrospective review from Discovolante for the American online publication Sputnikmusic. The reviewer claimed it to be one of the most impressive debut albums from a Japanese artist and that there were few flaws to be found. A staff member from CDJournal stated that Misia possessed "outstanding vocal ability" and stated that her appeal as a vocalist is probably the most important thing. A staff member from HMV stated that Misia's subtle emotional expression and sense of rhythm are exquisite, and her character is cute and there is nothing to complain about with the record. The album won the Best Album Award at the 40th Japan Record Awards at the end of the same year, becoming one of the winning albums in the category alongside Every Little Thing's Time to Destination and Glay's Pure Soul.

== Reception and impact ==
Mother Father Brother Sister debuted at number three on the weekly Oricon Albums Chart with 330,660 copies sold. The album stayed in the top three the next two weeks, and on its fourth week reached the top of the charts with 277,990 copies sold. The album remained in the top five for eleven consecutive weeks and in the top 300 for 77 weeks in total, selling over 2.58 million copies in Japan alone. As it sold 2,246,400 copies in 1998, it was the eighth best-selling album of that year. It shifted another 284,010 copies in 1999, becoming the 82nd best-selling album of that year. The success of Mother Father Brother Sister is credited for helping spread R&B through the Japanese mainstream, which therefore paved the way for future prolific female R&B singers such as Hikaru Utada and Sugar Soul. As well as being Misia's highest-selling album, Mother Father Brother Sister is also the seventh best-selling debut album and 38th best-selling album of all time in Japan.

== Track listing ==
No.	Title	Lyrics	Music	Length
1.	"Never Gonna Cry! Strings Overture"		Shirō Sagisu	0:53
2.	"K.I.T"	Misia	Satoshi Shimano	4:22
3.	"Koisuru Kisetsu" (恋する季節, "Loving Season")	Toshitaka Sonoda, Chihiro Close	S. Shimano	5:42
4.	"I'm Over Here (Kizuite)" (I'm over here ～気づいて～, "I'm Over Here (Realize)")	Misia	S. Shimano	5:05
5.	"Interlude #1"		S. Shimano	0:57
6.	"Tell Me"	Misia	S. Shimano	5:05
7.	"Kiss-shite Dakishimete" (キスして抱きしめて Kisushite Dakishimete, "Kiss and Hold Me")	Misia	Misia	5:08
8.	"Cry"	Misia	S. Shimano	5:43
9.	"Interlude #2"		S. Shimano	0:41
10.	"Chiisana Koi" (小さな恋, "A Little Love")	Misia	S. Shimano	5:34
11.	"Hi no Ataru Basho" (陽のあたる場所, "A Place in the Sun")	Misia, Jun Sasaki	J. Sasaki	5:15
12.	"Hoshi no Furu Oka" (星の降る丘, "A Starry Hill")	C. Close	S. Shimano	5:43
13.	"Tsutsumikomu You ni... (Dave "EQ3" Dub Mix)" (つつみ込むように… (DAVE“EQ3”DUB MIX), "Like Being Wrapped Up...")	S. Shimano	S. Shimano	5:48
14.	"Never Gonna Cry!"	Yoshiyuki Murakami, Suzi Kim, Tai	Hiroshi Matsui	6:10
15.	"Never Gonna Cry! (Junior Vasquez Remix Radio Edition)" (Secret Track)	Y. Murakami, S. Kim, Tai	H. Matsui	6:00

== Charts ==
=== Weekly charts ===
Chart (1998)	Peak position
Japanese Albums (Oricon)	1

=== Year-end charts ===
Chart (1998)	Position
Japanese Albums (Oricon)	8

1999 year-end charts for Mother Father Brother Sister
Chart (1999)	Position
Japanese Albums (Oricon)	82

=== Decade-end charts ===
Chart (1990–1999)	Position
Japanese Albums (Oricon)	26

=== All-time chart ===
Chart	Position
Japanese Albums (Oricon)	37

== Certifications and sales ==
Region	Certification	Certified units/sales
Japan (RIAJ)	2× Million	2,580,150
