= Takuya Kuroda =

Japanese jazz trumpeter and arranger (born 1980)

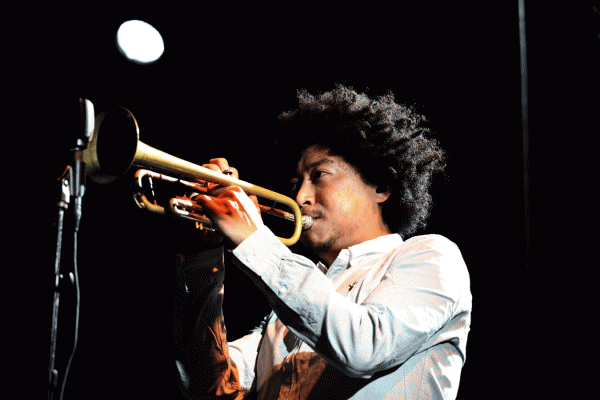

Background information
- Born: 21 February 1980 (age 46); Ashiya, Hyōgo, Japan
- Genres: Jazz
- Occupations: Musician, arranger
- Instrument: trumpet
- Labels: Blue Note, Concord
- Website: takuyakuroda.com

Takuya Kuroda (Japanese: 黒田 卓也, Hepburn: Kuroda Takuya; born 21 February 1980, in Ashiya, Hyōgo) is a Japanese jazz trumpeter and arranger.

Kuroda came to music by joining his school's big band. Later he frequently visited jam sessions in Kobe. In 2003 he moved to the United States and was a course participant at Berklee College of Music before settling in Brooklyn, New York City. He later attended the College of Performing Arts of The New School, where he studied jazz and contemporary music, earning his degree in 2006. His study colleague José James became a close friend and musical partner, in 2014 producing his studio album Rising Son.

== Discography ==
=== As leader ===
- Bitter and High (CD Baby, 2010)
- Edge (CD Baby, 2011)
- Six Aces (P-Vine, 2013)
- Rising Son (Blue Note, 2014)
- Zigzagger (Concord, 2016)
- Fly Moon Die Soon (First Word, 2020)
- Midnight Crisp (First Word, 2022)
- Everyday (PPK Records, 2025)

=== As sideman ===
- José James, Blackmagic (Brownswood Recordings, 2010)
- José James, No Beginning No End (Blue Note, 2013)
- José James, While You Were Sleeping (Blue Note, 2014)

=== Other appearances ===
- Blue Note Voyage (Blue Note, 2019) - Compilation album with Akihiro Nishiguchi, May Inoue, Jun Miyakawa, Ai Kuwabara, Ryuta Tsunoda, Tomo Kanno, Shun Ishiwaka
