= Hi no Ataru Basho =

Single by Misia

from the album Mother Father Brother Sister
- Released: May 21, 1998
- Recorded: 1998
- Genre: R&B, Pop
- Length: 21:54
- Label: Arista Japan
- Songwriters: Misia, Toshitaka Sonoda, Chihiro Close, Jun Sasaki, Satoshi Shimano

Misia singles chronology
"Tsutsumikomu Yō ni..." (1998)	"Hi no Ataru Basho" (1998)	"Believe" (1999)

Music video
- "Hi no Ataru Basho" on YouTube

"Hi no Ataru Basho" (陽のあたる場所; lit. "A Place in the Sun") is Japanese R&B singer Misia's second single, released on May 21, 1998. It debuted on the weekly Oricon singles chart at #15 with 31,450 copies sold. Four weeks later, the single climbed to its peak at #9.

"Hi no Ataru Basho" was the theme song to the film 'Hood, as well as the NTV program Docchi no Ryōri Show.

== Track list ==
No.	Title	Lyrics	Music	Length
1.	"Hi no Ataru Basho (Original Mix) (陽のあたる場所; A Place in the Sun)"	Misia, Jun Sasaki	J. Sasaki	5:15
2.	"Koisuru Kisetsu (恋する季節; Season of Love)"	Toshitaka Sonoda, Chihiro Close	Satoshi Shimano	5:41
3.	"Hi no Ataru Basho (Master Key Remix: featuring K-Dub Shine)"	Misia, J. Sasaki	J. Sasaki	5:22
4.	"Hi no Ataru Basho (New Soul River Dub)"	Misia, J. Sasaki	J. Sasaki	5:25

== Charts ==
=== Oricon Sales Chart ===
Release	Chart	Peak Position	Debut Sales	Sales Total	Chart Run
May 21, 1998	Oricon Daily Singles Chart			131,635	13 weeks
May 21, 1998	Oricon Weekly Singles Chart	9	31,450	131,635	13 weeks
May 21, 1998	Oricon Monthly Singles Chart	13		131,635	13 weeks
May 21, 1998	Oricon Yearly Singles Chart			131,635	13 weeks
