= Marvelous (album) =

Studio album by Misia
- Released: April 25, 2001
- Recorded: 2000
- Genre: R&B, J-pop
- Length: 66:05
- Label: Arista Japan
- Producer: Misia

Misia chronology
Misia Remix 2000 Little Tokyo (2000)	Marvelous (2001)	Misia Remix 2002 World Peace (2001)

Alternative Cover
- First press cover

Singles from Marvelous
- 1. "Escape" Released: July 7, 2000; 2. "Everything" Released: October 25, 2000; 3. "I Miss You: Toki wo Koete" Released: January 1, 2001

Marvelous is Misia's third studio album and first self-produced album, released on April 25, 2001. It sold 881,150 copies in its first week, peaked at #1 for two consecutive weeks, and spent five weeks in the Top 5. The first pressing of the album came in sleeve case packaging. Marvelous is the 118th best-selling album of all time in Japan. It came in at #8 on the overall yearly chart, however Marvelous was the second highest selling original album of 2001, behind Hikaru Utada's Distance.

== Track listing ==
No.	Title	Lyrics	Music	Length
1.	"Intro"		Keiichi Tomita	0:59
2.	"Rhythm Reflection"	Misia	Sakoshin	4:45
3.	"Ai no Uta" (愛の歌, "Love Song")	Misia	Jun Sasaki	5:32
4.	"Sunny Day"	Chihiro Close	Nobuyuki Shimizu	5:10
5.	"Ano Natsu no Mama de" (あの夏のままで, "Just Like That Summer")	Misia	Hidetoshi Yamada	5:49
6.	"Nocturne"	Misia	Shirō Sagisu	6:10
7.	"Escape"	Misia	Misia, Sakoshin	4:53
8.	"La La La"	Misia	Satoshi Shimano	5:59
9.	"Change for Good"	Misia	Sakoshin	5:46
10.	"Everything"	Misia	Toshiaki Matsumoto	7:47
11.	"Toki o Tomete" (時をとめて, "Stop Time")	Misia	Misia	4:46
12.	"I Miss You (Toki o Koete)" (I miss you ～時を越えて～, "I Miss You (Crossing Time)")	Misia	Masato Nakamura, Misia	3:35
13.	"Everything (Junior Vasquez Remix)"	Misia	Toshiaki Matsumoto	4:48

== Charts ==
=== Oricon Sales Chart ===
Release	Chart	Peak position	First day/week sales	Sales total
April 25, 2001	Oricon Daily Albums Chart	1		
April 25, 2001	Oricon Weekly Albums Chart	1	881,150	1,637,540
April 25, 2001	Oricon Monthly Albums Chart	1 (May)		
April 25, 2001	Oricon Yearly Albums Chart	8		

=== Physical Sales Charts ===
Chart	Peak position
Oricon Daily Albums Chart	1
Oricon Weekly Albums Chart	1
Oricon Monthly Albums Chart	1
Soundscan Albums Chart (CD-Only)	1
