= Believe (Misia song) =

Single by Misia

from the album Love Is the Message
- Released: April 2, 1999
- Recorded: 1999
- Genre: R&B, J-Pop
- Length: 15:36 (8cm), 21:26 (12cm)
- Label: Arista Japan
- Songwriters: Misia, Chihiro Kurosu, Jun Sasaki

Misia singles chronology
"Hi no Ataru Basho" (1998)	"Believe" (1999)	"Wasurenai Hibi" (1999)

Alternative covers
- 8cm Single

Music video
- "Believe" on YouTube

"Believe" is Misia's 3rd single. It was released on April 21, 1999. It peaked at #2 selling 95,930 copies on its first week. The song was used in Hitachi's "Maxell MD" commercial. "Believe" is one of MISIA's signature songs.

== Track list ==
All lyrics are written by Misia, Chihiro Kurosu.

8cm Single
No.	Title	Length
1.	"Believe"	4:49
2.	"Hana/Tori/Kaze/Tsuki (花／鳥／風／月; Flower/Bird/Wind/Moon)"	5:49
3.	"Believe (Original Back Ground)"	4:49

All lyrics are written by Misia, Chihiro Kurosu.

12cm Single
No.	Title	Length
1.	"Believe"	4:49
2.	"Hana/Tori/Kaze/Tsuki"	5:48
3.	"Believe (DJ Watari Remix)"	5:48
4.	"Believe (English Breakfast Mix)"	4:45

== Charts ==
8 cm Single

Release	Chart	Peak position	Sales total	Chart run
April 21, 1999	Oricon Daily Singles Chart			
April 21, 1999	Oricon Weekly Singles Chart	23	66,240	10 weeks
April 21, 1999	Oricon Monthly Singles Chart			
April 21, 1999	Oricon Yearly Singles Chart			

12 cm Single

Release	Chart	Peak position	Sales total	Chart run
April 21, 1999	Oricon Daily Singles Chart	2		
April 21, 1999	Oricon Weekly Singles Chart	2	280,700	13 weeks
April 21, 1999	Oricon Monthly Singles Chart	10		
April 21, 1999	Oricon Yearly Singles Chart	82		
