= Everything (Misia song) =

2000 song by Misia

Single by Misia

from the album Marvelous
- Released: October 25, 2000
- Recorded: 2000
- Genre: Pop, R&B
- Length: 28:56
- Label: Arista Japan
- Songwriter: Misia
- Producer: Keiichi Tomita

Misia singles chronology
"Escape" (2000)	"Everything" (2000)	"I Miss You: Toki o Koete" (2001)

Music video
- "Everything" on YouTube

"Everything" is the seventh single by Japanese singer Misia, released on October 25, 2000. It debuted atop the Oricon singles chart and held the position for four non-consecutive weeks, ultimately emerging as Misia's biggest hit and signature song. In the Japanese music industry, "Everything" is the best-selling single by a female artist released in the 21st century, as well as the third best-selling single overall for a female Japanese artist, behind Namie Amuro's "CAN YOU CELEBRATE?" and Hikaru Utada's "Automatic/time will tell".

The title song served as theme song for the drama "Yamato Nadeshiko", which starred Nanako Matsushima and Shinichi Tsutsumi.

"Everything" has been covered by various artists, including Erykah Badu featuring Common, Eric Martin, Boyz II Men and Charice Pempengco.

== Track list ==
All lyrics are written by Misia.

No.	Title	Music	Remixer(s)	Length
1.	"Everything"	Toshiaki Matsumoto		6:58
2.	"Ai no Uta (愛の歌; Love Song)"	Jun Sasaki		5:32
3.	"Everything (Hex Hector's Club Mix)"	Toshiaki Matsumoto	Hex Hector	10:56
4.	"Escape (DJ Watarai Remix)"	Misia, Sakoshin	DJ Watarai	5:18

== Charts ==
=== Oricon Sales Chart ===
Release	Chart	Peak Position	Debut Sales	Sales Total	Chart Run
October 25, 2000	Oricon Daily Singles Chart	1			
October 25, 2000	Oricon Weekly Singles Chart	1	306,580	2,000,000	26 weeks
October 25, 2000	Oricon Monthly Singles Chart	1			
October 25, 2000	Oricon Yearly Singles Chart	14 (2000); 12 (2001)			

=== Physical Sales Charts ===
Chart	Peak position
Oricon Daily Singles Chart	1
Oricon Weekly Singles Chart	1
Oricon Monthly Singles Chart	1
Oricon Yearly Singles Chart	12
Soundscan Singles Chart (CD-Only)	1

=== Other charts ===
Chart (2017)	Peak position
Japan Streaming Songs (Billboard)	79
