= Tsutsumikomu Yō ni... =

Single by Misia

from the album Mother Father Brother Sister
- Released: February 21, 1998
- Recorded: 1997–1998
- Genre: R&B; pop
- Length: 17:53 (8cm); 39:51 (12cm)
- Label: Arista Japan
- Songwriters: Satoshi Shimano; Yoshiyuki Murakami; Tai; Matsui Hiroshi

Misia singles chronology
"Tsutsumikomu Yō ni..." (1998)	"Hi no Ataru Basho" (1998)

Alternative cover
- 8cm single cover

"Tsutsumikomu Yō ni..." (つつみ込むように…; lit. "All Wrapped Up...") is the debut single of Japanese R&B singer Misia, released on February 21, 1998. It sold 3,030 (8 cm) and 2,350 (12 cm) copies in its first week but became a long seller and after 16 weeks, it peaked at #11 and #20 respectively.

Because the Oricon charts only started adding up the total for both versions of a single in May 2001, "Tsutsumikomu Yō ni..." could not reach the Top 10. Had both versions been counted as one, the single would have peaked at #8 on its tenth week, as well as remaining in the Top 10 for seven non-consecutive weeks. "Tsutsumikomu Yō ni..." is the only single for which Misia did not contribute lyrics to.

The song was used in an Elleseine cosmetics commercial.

Makidai, now a member of Exile, was one of the backup dancers featured in the music video of "Tsutsumikomu Yō ni...".

== Track list ==
8cm Single
No.	Title	Lyrics	Music	Length
1.	"Tsutsumikomu Yō ni... (Original Mix) (つつみ込むように…; All Wrapped Up...)"	Satoshi Shimano	S. Shimano	5:47
2.	"Never gonna cry! (Original Mix)"	Yoshiyuki Murakami, Suzi Kim, Tai	Hiroshi Matsui	6:09
3.	"Tsutsumikomu Yō ni... (Original Karaoke) (つつみ込むように… (Original Karaoke))"		S. Shimano	5:47

12cm Single
No.	Title	Lyrics	Music	Length
1.	"Tsutsumikomu Yō ni... (Original Mix) (つつみ込むように…; All Wrapped Up...)"	S. Shimano	S. Shimano	5:48
2.	"Tsutsumikomu Yō ni... (DJ Watarai Remix: Featuring Muro) (つつみ込むように… (DJ WATARAI REMIX～Featuring MURO))"	S. Shimano, Muro	S. Shimano	6:18
3.	"Never gonna cry! (Original Mix)"	Y. Murakami, S. Kim, Tai	H. Matsui	6:09
4.	"Never gonna cry! (Junior Vasquez Remix)"	Y. Murakami, S. Kim, Tai	H. Matsui	11:07
5.	"Never gonna cry! (JV Dub Mix)"	Y. Murakami, S. Kim, Tai	H. Matsui	10:14

== Charts ==
=== Oricon sales chart (8cm) ===
Release	Chart	Peak position	Debut sales	Sales total
February 21, 1998	Oricon Weekly Singles Chart	11	3,030	408,580
February 21, 1998	Oricon Yearly Singles Chart	61		408,580

=== Oricon sales chart (12cm) ===
Release	Chart	Peak position	Debut sales	Sales total
February 21, 1998	Oricon Weekly Singles Chart	20	2,350	269,280
February 21, 1998	Oricon Yearly Singles Chart	89		269,280

== Cover versions ==
- In 2000, S.E.S. released a Korean remake titled "감싸안으며 (Show Me Your Love)" featured on their album A Letter from Greenland.
- In 2009, W.C.D.A. recorded a house music version of the song.
- In 2022, iScream released a cover of the song as their 3rd digital single.
