= The Tour of Misia 2007 Ascension =

2006–07 concert tour by Misia

- Tour by Misia
- Promotional poster for the tour
- Associated album: Ascension
- Start date: November 18, 2006
- End date: February 10, 2007
- Legs: 1
- No. of shows: 19

Misia concert chronology
- Hoshizora no Live III Music Is a Joy Forever (2006); The Tour of Misia 2007 Ascension (2006–07); Hoshizora no Live IV Classics (2007)

The Tour of Misia 2007 Ascension was the eleventh concert tour by Japanese recording artist Misia, in support of her album Ascension (2007). Comprising a set list of songs from Ascension and previous albums, including two hip-hop and house medleys, the tour visited arenas nationwide for a duration of four months. The tour was announced on August 3, 2006, two days prior to the start of Misia's Hoshizora no Live III Music Is a Joy Forever summer tour. The Tour of Misia 2007 Ascension commenced in November 2006 and concluded three days after the release of Ascension, in February 2007. Initially scheduled to run for eighteen shows, an additional date was later added to the itinerary. Sponsored by OCN, the tour drew an estimated audience of 160,000.

The concept for the show is described as "futuristic rhythm with a taste of nature." The stage resembled a floating octagon-shape mirror, adorned with 10,000 LED lights and overlooked by a giant pipe-made elephant head, reminiscent of the first press edition cover artwork of Ascension.

On April 6, 2007, WOWOW aired a special titled The Tour of Misia 2007 in Yokohama Arena, which showed a TV edit of the tour's finale show.

== Opening acts ==
- May J. (February 3–4, 2007 dates only)

== Setlist ==
November 18, 2006
- "Color of Life"
- "Shinin' (Nijiiro no Rhythm)"

Hip hop medley
- "TYO"
- "Future Funk"
- "Escape"
- "Change for Good"
- "Ai no Uta" (愛の歌)
- "Sunny Day"
- "Change for Good"
- "Believe"
- "Don't Stop Music!"
- "Groovin'"
- "In My Soul"

- "Hi no Ataru Basho"
- "Key of Love"
- "Tsutsumikomu Yō ni..."
- "Remember Lady"
- "Snow Song"
- "Nemurenu Yoru wa Kimi no Sei"
- "Suna no Shiro" (砂の城)
- "Tsuki" (月)
- "Angel"

House medley
- "The Glory Day (Gomi Mix)"
- "Everything (Junior Vasquez Remix)"
- "Kokoro Hitotsu (DJ Gomi Mix)"
- "Wasurenai Hibi (Hex Hector's Club Mix)"
- "Tobikata o Wasureta Chiisana Tori (Malawi Rocks Remix)" (飛び方を忘れた小さな鳥)

- "Into the Light"

Encore

- "Sea of Dreams"
- "Luv Parade"
November 19–25, December 10–16, 2006

Hip hop medley
- "TYO"
- "Future Funk"
- "Escape"
- "Change for Good"
- "Ai no Uta" (愛の歌)
- "Sunny Day"
- "Change for Good"
- "Believe"
- "Don't Stop Music!"
- "Groovin'"
- "In My Soul"

- "Hi no Ataru Basho"
- "Key of Love"
- "Tsutsumikomu Yō ni..."
- "Remember Lady"
- "Nemurenu Yoru wa Kimi no Sei"
- "Snow Song"
- "Suna no Shiro" (砂の城)
- "Tsuki" (月)
- "Kiss Shite Dakishimete" (キスして抱きしめて)
- "Angel"

House medley
- "The Glory Day (Gomi Mix)"
- "Everything (Junior Vasquez Remix)"
- "Kokoro Hitotsu (DJ Gomi Mix)"
- "Wasurenai Hibi (Hex Hector's Club Mix)"
- "Tobikata o Wasureta Chiisana Tori (Malawi Rocks Remix)" (飛び方を忘れた小さな鳥)

- "Into the Light"

Encore

- "Color of Life"
- "Shinin' (Nijiiro no Rhythm)"
- "Sea of Dreams"
- "Luv Parade"
December 9, 2006

Hip hop medley
- "TYO"
- "Future Funk"
- "Escape"
- "Change for Good"
- "Ai no Uta" (愛の歌)
- "Sunny Day"
- "Change for Good"
- "Believe"
- "Don't Stop Music!"
- "Groovin'"
- "In My Soul"

- "Hi no Ataru Basho"
- "Key of Love"
- "Tsutsumikomu Yō ni..."
- "Remember Lady"
- "Nemurenu Yoru wa Kimi no Sei"
- "Snow Song"
- "Suna no Shiro" (砂の城)
- "Tsuki" (月)
- "Song for You"
- "Angel"

House medley
- "The Glory Day (Gomi Mix)"
- "Everything (Junior Vasquez Remix)"
- "Kokoro Hitotsu (DJ Gomi Mix)"
- "Wasurenai Hibi (Hex Hector's Club Mix)"
- "Tobikata o Wasureta Chiisana Tori (Malawi Rocks Remix)" (飛び方を忘れた小さな鳥)

- "Into the Light"

Encore

- "Color of Life"
- "Shinin' (Nijiiro no Rhythm)"
- "Sea of Dreams"
- "Luv Parade"
December 17, 2006

Hip hop medley
- "TYO"
- "Future Funk"
- "Escape"
- "Change for Good"
- "Ai no Uta" (愛の歌)
- "Sunny Day"
- "Change for Good"
- "Believe"
- "Don't Stop Music!"
- "Groovin'"
- "In My Soul"

- "Hi no Ataru Basho"
- "Key of Love"
- "Tsutsumikomu Yō ni..."
- "Remember Lady"
- "Nemurenu Yoru wa Kimi no Sei"
- "Snow Song"
- "Suna no Shiro" (砂の城)
- "Tsuki" (月)
- "It's Just Love"
- "Angel"

House medley
- "The Glory Day (Gomi Mix)"
- "Everything (Junior Vasquez Remix)"
- "Kokoro Hitotsu (DJ Gomi Mix)"
- "Wasurenai Hibi (Hex Hector's Club Mix)"
- "Tobikata o Wasureta Chiisana Tori (Malawi Rocks Remix)" (飛び方を忘れた小さな鳥)

- "Into the Light"

Encore

- "Color of Life"
- "Shinin' (Nijiiro no Rhythm)"
- "Sea of Dreams"
- "Luv Parade"
- "Holy Hold Me"
December 23, 2006

Hip hop medley
- "TYO"
- "Future Funk"
- "Escape"
- "Change for Good"
- "Ai no Uta" (愛の歌)
- "Sunny Day"
- "Change for Good"
- "Believe"
- "Don't Stop Music!"
- "Groovin'"
- "In My Soul"

- "Hi no Ataru Basho"
- "Key of Love"
- "Tsutsumikomu Yō ni..."
- "Remember Lady"
- "Nemurenu Yoru wa Kimi no Sei"
- "Snow Song"
- "Suna no Shiro" (砂の城)
- "Tsuki" (月)
- "Kiss Shite Dakishimete" (キスして抱きしめて)
- "Holy Hold Me"
- "Angel"

House medley
- "The Glory Day (Gomi Mix)"
- "Everything (Junior Vasquez Remix)"
- "Kokoro Hitotsu (DJ Gomi Mix)"
- "Wasurenai Hibi (Hex Hector's Club Mix)"
- "Tobikata o Wasureta Chiisana Tori (Malawi Rocks Remix)" (飛び方を忘れた小さな鳥)

- "Into the Light"

Encore

- "Color of Life"
- "Shinin' (Nijiiro no Rhythm)"
- "Sea of Dreams"
- "Luv Parade"
December 24, 2006

Hip hop medley
- "TYO"
- "Future Funk"
- "Escape"
- "Change for Good"
- "Ai no Uta" (愛の歌)
- "Sunny Day"
- "Change for Good"
- "Believe"
- "Don't Stop Music!"
- "Groovin'"
- "In My Soul"

- "Hi no Ataru Basho"
- "Key of Love"
- "Tsutsumikomu Yō ni..."
- "Remember Lady"
- "Nemurenu Yoru wa Kimi no Sei"
- "Snow Song"
- "Suna no Shiro" (砂の城)
- "Tsuki" (月)
- "Song for You"
- "Angel"

House medley
- "The Glory Day (Gomi Mix)"
- "Everything (Junior Vasquez Remix)"
- "Kokoro Hitotsu (DJ Gomi Mix)"
- "Wasurenai Hibi (Hex Hector's Club Mix)"
- "Tobikata o Wasureta Chiisana Tori (Malawi Rocks Remix)" (飛び方を忘れた小さな鳥)

- "Into the Light"

Encore

- "Color of Life"
- "Shinin' (Nijiiro no Rhythm)"
- "Sea of Dreams"
- "Luv Parade"
- "Holy Hold Me"
January 6, 2007

Hip hop medley
- "TYO"
- "Future Funk"
- "Escape"
- "Change for Good"
- "Ai no Uta" (愛の歌)
- "Sunny Day"
- "Change for Good"
- "Believe"
- "Don't Stop Music!"
- "Groovin'"
- "In My Soul"

- "Hi no Ataru Basho"
- "Key of Love"
- "Tsutsumikomu Yō ni..."
- "Remember Lady"
- "Nemurenu Yoru wa Kimi no Sei"
- "Snow Song"
- "Suna no Shiro" (砂の城)
- "Tsuki" (月)
- "Song for You"
- "Angel"

House medley
- "The Glory Day (Gomi Mix)"
- "Everything (Junior Vasquez Remix)"
- "Kokoro Hitotsu (DJ Gomi Mix)"
- "Wasurenai Hibi (Hex Hector's Club Mix)"
- "Tobikata o Wasureta Chiisana Tori (Malawi Rocks Remix)" (飛び方を忘れた小さな鳥)

- "Into the Light"

Encore

- "Color of Life"
- "Shinin' (Nijiiro no Rhythm)"
- "Sea of Dreams"
- "Luv Parade"
- "We Are the Music"
January 7–13–20, 2007

Hip hop medley
- "TYO"
- "Future Funk"
- "Escape"
- "Change for Good"
- "Ai no Uta" (愛の歌)
- "Sunny Day"
- "Change for Good"
- "Believe"
- "Don't Stop Music!"
- "Groovin'"
- "In My Soul"

- "Hi no Ataru Basho"
- "Key of Love"
- "Tsutsumikomu Yō ni..."
- "Remember Lady"
- "Nemurenu Yoru wa Kimi no Sei"
- "Snow Song"
- "Angel"
- "Suna no Shiro" (砂の城)
- "Tsuki" (月)
- "Sea of Dreams"

House medley
- "The Glory Day (Gomi Mix)"
- "Everything (Junior Vasquez Remix)"
- "Kokoro Hitotsu (DJ Gomi Mix)"
- "Wasurenai Hibi (Hex Hector's Club Mix)"
- "Tobikata o Wasureta Chiisana Tori (Malawi Rocks Remix)" (飛び方を忘れた小さな鳥)

- "Into the Light"

Encore

- "Color of Life"
- "Shinin' (Nijiiro no Rhythm)"
- "We Are the Music"
- "Luv Parade"
January 21–27–28, February 3, 2007

Hip hop medley
- "TYO"
- "Future Funk"
- "Escape"
- "Change for Good"
- "Ai no Uta" (愛の歌)
- "Sunny Day"
- "Change for Good"
- "Believe"
- "Don't Stop Music!"
- "Groovin'"
- "In My Soul"

- "Hi no Ataru Basho"
- "Key of Love"
- "Tsutsumikomu Yō ni..."
- "Remember Lady"
- "Nemurenu Yoru wa Kimi no Sei"
- "Snow Song"
- "Angel"
- "Suna no Shiro" (砂の城)
- "Tsuki" (月)
- "Kiss Shite Dakishimete" (キスして抱きしめて)
- "Sea of Dreams"

House medley
- "The Glory Day (Gomi Mix)"
- "Everything (Junior Vasquez Remix)"
- "Kokoro Hitotsu (DJ Gomi Mix)"
- "Wasurenai Hibi (Hex Hector's Club Mix)"
- "Tobikata o Wasureta Chiisana Tori (Malawi Rocks Remix)" (飛び方を忘れた小さな鳥)

- "Into the Light"

Encore

- "Color of Life"
- "Shinin' (Nijiiro no Rhythm)"
- "We Are the Music"
- "Luv Parade"
February 4–10, 2007

Hip hop medley
- "TYO"
- "Future Funk"
- "Escape"
- "Change for Good"
- "Ai no Uta" (愛の歌)
- "Sunny Day"
- "Change for Good"
- "Believe"
- "Don't Stop Music!"
- "Groovin'"
- "In My Soul"

- "Hi no Ataru Basho"
- "Key of Love"
- "Tsutsumikomu Yō ni..."
- "Remember Lady"
- "Nemurenu Yoru wa Kimi no Sei"
- "Snow Song"
- "Angel"
- "Suna no Shiro" (砂の城)
- "Tsuki" (月)
- "Song for You"
- "Sea of Dreams"

House medley
- "The Glory Day (Gomi Mix)"
- "Everything (Junior Vasquez Remix)"
- "Kokoro Hitotsu (DJ Gomi Mix)"
- "Wasurenai Hibi (Hex Hector's Club Mix)"
- "Tobikata o Wasureta Chiisana Tori (Malawi Rocks Remix)" (飛び方を忘れた小さな鳥)

- "Into the Light"

Encore

- "Color of Life"
- "Shinin' (Nijiiro no Rhythm)"
- "We Are the Music"
- "Luv Parade"

== Tour dates ==
Date	City	Country	Venue
November 18, 2006	Fukuroi	Japan	Ecopa Arena
November 19, 2006	Fukuroi	Japan	Ecopa Arena
November 25, 2006	Rifu	Japan	Sekisui Heim Super Arena
December 9, 2006	Saitama	Japan	Saitama Super Arena
December 10, 2006	Saitama	Japan	Saitama Super Arena
December 16, 2006	Fukuoka	Japan	Marine Messe Fukuoka
December 17, 2006	Fukuoka	Japan	Marine Messe Fukuoka
December 23, 2006	Sapporo	Japan	Hokkaido Prefectural Sports Center
December 24, 2006	Sapporo	Japan	Hokkaido Prefectural Sports Center
January 6, 2007	Nagoya	Japan	Nippon Gaishi Hall
January 7, 2007	Nagoya	Japan	Nippon Gaishi Hall
January 13, 2007	Niigata	Japan	Toki Messe
January 20, 2007	Kobe	Japan	World Memorial Hall
January 21, 2007	Kobe	Japan	World Memorial Hall
January 27, 2007	Osaka	Japan	Osaka-jō Hall
January 28, 2007	Osaka	Japan	Osaka-jō Hall
February 3, 2007	Yokohama	Japan	Yokohama Arena
February 4, 2007	Yokohama	Japan	Yokohama Arena
February 10, 2007	Yokohama	Japan	Yokohama Arena

== Personnel ==
- Executive Producer – Hiroto Tanigawa
- Hip Hop Medley Producer – Megaraiders
- House Medley Producer – DJ Gomi
- Production Producer – Kazuhiko Igarashi
- Stage Manager(s) – Shuichi Majima, Ryoko Tsukahara, Mitsuru Morita
- Set Director(s) – Chihiro Natori, Hiromi Shibata, Teruhiko Kuroki
- Set Design – Yuko Kohga
- Steel Master – Nobuyuki Yoshimoto
- Costume Director – Kyoko Fushimi
- Knit Direction – Mayutan
- Knit Designer(s) – Jung-jung, Mindy, Risa Yuasa
- Sound Planner – Keiji Shigeta
- PA Operator(s) – Takashi Mitsui, Miyuki Tsuzuki
- Lighting Planner – Ikuo Ogawa
- Lighting Operator(s) – Masaaki Takahashi, Makoto Setoyama, Takashi Fujiwara
- Lighting Effect Planner – Seiichi Tozuka
- Lighting Effect Operator(s) – Nozomu Omae, Hiromi Iizuka
- Special Effect Planner – Takeshi Hagino
- Special Effect Operator – Kanako Chiba
- Equipment Technician(s) – Kazuyuki Okada, Keiji Tateishi, Takuya Kimura, Hiroshi Yamane
- Power Supply Operator(s) – Naotaka Tanimura, Yasutada Shibata
- Special Stage Set – Minoru Osada
- Camera System – Yasuhiro Shimizu, Ryuta Honma
- Transporter(s) – Setsuo Noto, Miwa Morioka
- Drums – Jun Aoyama
- Keyboards – Tohru Shigemi
- Bass – Takeshi Taneda
- Guitar – Kenji Suzuki
- Chorus/Organ – Kumi Sasaki
- DJ – Ta-Shi
- Dancer(s) – Stezo, Hyrossi, U-Ge, Michie, Hiro, Nada, Wadoo, Kota, Tatsuo, Soichiro, Gan
- Band Manager – Mari Koda
- Dancer Manager – Hiroaki Kusano
- Sports Trainer(s) – Yukinori Narushima, Takayuki Yumioka, Kayoko Nakagawa
- Wardrobe – Erina Ishihara
- Make Up – Kaori
- Hair – Yukimi Ueda
- Artist Manager(s) – Naoko Kobayashi, Toshiyuki Kimura
- Merchandising – Hiroshi Suzuki, Keisuke Sato, Rui Nishikawa
- Food Coordination – Masahi Mizukoshi
- Club MSA – Kyosuke Ogata, Tsutomu Yamashiro, Hiroko Goto
- Tour Coordination – Chieko Ishii, Tetsuro Ishihara
- Tour Coordination Assistant(s) – Kumiko Ohata, Kimie Ikeda
- Tour Sponsor(s) – OCN
- Promoter(s) – WESS, Kyodo Tohoku, Kyodo Hokuriku, Disk Garage, Sundayfolk Promotion, Sundayfolk Promotion Hizuoka, Kyodo Osaka, Kyodo Nishinippon
- Producer(s) – Yasunao Matsumoto, Hiroyuki Ishigaki

Credits and personnel as per The Tour of Misia 2007 Ascension concert DVD.
