= Luv Parade—Color of Life =

"Luv Parade/Color of Life"

Single by Misia

from the album Ascension
- Released: July 5, 2006
- Recorded: 2006
- Genre: R&B, house, pop
- Length: 4:12 ("Luv Parade"); 4:43 ("Color of Life")
- Label: Rhythmedia Tribe
- Songwriters: Misia, Vinny Vero, Marco Nicosia, Joi
- Producers: Chokkaku, Joi

Misia singles chronology
"Namae no Nai Sora o Miagete" (2004)	"Luv Parade/Color of Life" (2006)	"Sea of Dreams: Tokyo DisneySea 5th Anniversary Theme Song" (2006)

Alternative cover
- Artwork for the "Color of Life" sleeve

Music video
- "Luv Parade" on YouTube

"Luv Parade/Color of Life" is the fifteenth single by Japanese recording artist Misia. It was released on July 5, 2006 as the first single from Misia's seventh studio album Ascension.

== Background ==
"Luv Parade"
A 28-second sample of the second chorus and bridge of "Luv Parade."

"Color of Life"
A 29-second sample of the final chorus of "Color of Life," as used in the Toyota WISH commercial.

"Luv Parade/Color of Life" is Misia's first single release in two years. It is Misia's second double A-side single, the first since "In My Soul/Snow Song from Mars & Roses." The single package features double covers: a "Luv Parade" edit and a "Color of Life" edit. The first pressing of "Luv Parade/Color of Life" comes housed in a cardboard sleeve.

"Luv Parade" was written by Misia and composed and produced by American producer Vinny Vero and Swedish producer Marco Nicosia. It was used in commercials for three different online music stores, Music.jp, Iromelomix DX by Dwango, and Mu-Mo by Avex, and became the first song to advertise all three companies. "Color of Life" was written by Misia, co-composed by Misia and Joi, and produced by Joi. The song was used in commercials for the Toyota WISH, starring football player Hidetoshi Nakata.

The B-side, "Taiyō ga Kureta Present," was also written by Misia, co-composed by Misia and Mits Ishibashi, and produced by Ishibashi. The song was used in commercials for Live One by Sumitomo Life, starring actress Nanako Matsushima. The single also includes a Joe Claussell remix of the digital single "Shinin' (Nijiiro no Rhythm)."

== Chart performance ==
"Luv Parade/Color of Life" debuted on the Oricon Daily Singles chart at number 11 and peaked at number 16 on the Oricon Weekly Singles chart, with 13,632 copies sold in its first week. The single charted for eight weeks and sold a total of 24,410 copies.

== Track listing ==
All lyrics are written by Misia.

No.	Title	Music	Remixer(s)	Length
1.	"Luv Parade"	Vinny Vero, Marco Nicosia		4:12
2.	"Color of Life"	Misia, Joi		4:43
3.	"Taiyō ga Kureta Present" (太陽がくれたプレゼント "Present of the Sun")	Misia, Mits Ishibashi		4:18
4.	"Shinin' (Nijiiro no Rhythm) (Club Love NY Vocal Radio Mix)"	Joi	Joaquin "Joe" Claussell	5:39
Total length:				18:52

== Charts ==
Chart (2006)	Peak position
Oricon Daily Singles	11
Oricon Weekly Singles	16
SoundScan Japan Weekly Singles	11
Taiwan Five Music J-pop/K-pop Chart	13

== Release history ==
Region	Date	Format	Label
Japan	July 5, 2006	CD, digital download	Rhythmedia Tribe
Taiwan	July 19, 2006	CD	Avex Taiwan
Hong Kong	July 20, 2006	CD	Avex Asia
