= Toyota Wish =

Compact car by Toyota from 2003 to 2017

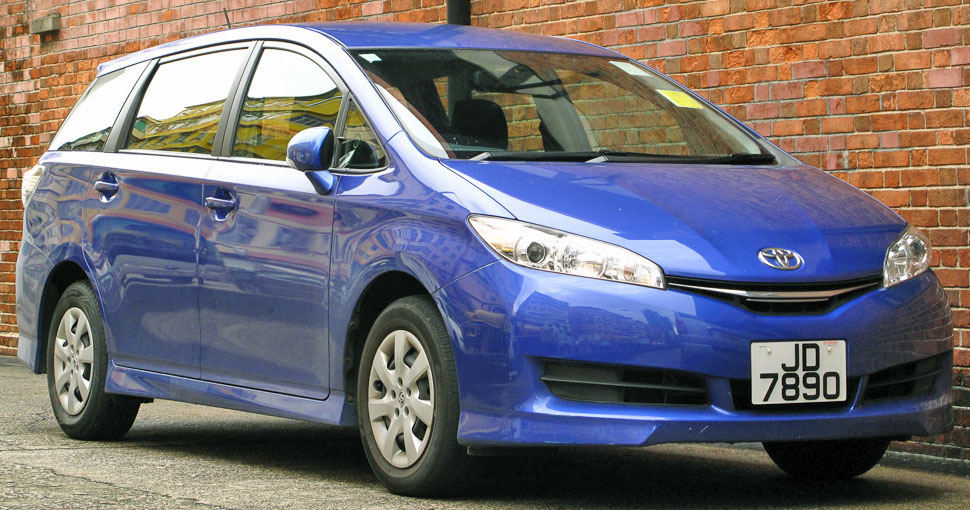
- Toyota Wish (ZGE20, Hong Kong)

Overview
- Manufacturer: Toyota
- Production: 2003–2017

Body and chassis
- Class: Compact MPV
- Body style: 5-door station wagon
- Layout: Front-engine, front-wheel-drive Front-engine, four-wheel-drive
- Platform: Toyota MC platform

Chronology
- Successor: Toyota Sienta; Toyota Noah/Voxy/Esquire; Toyota Prius α/Prius V

The Toyota Wish (Japanese: トヨタ・ウィッシュ, Hepburn: Toyota Wisshu) is an automobile produced by the Japanese automaker Toyota from 2003 to 2017. It is a compact MPV with standard three-row seating, and was positioned between the Corolla Spacio and the Ipsum in Toyota's minivan lineup. In Japan, it was available at Toyota Netz dealerships.

Apart from Japan, the Wish was also assembled in Thailand (for Malaysia and Singapore) and Taiwan. It was also sold in Hong Kong, where it was imported from Japan.

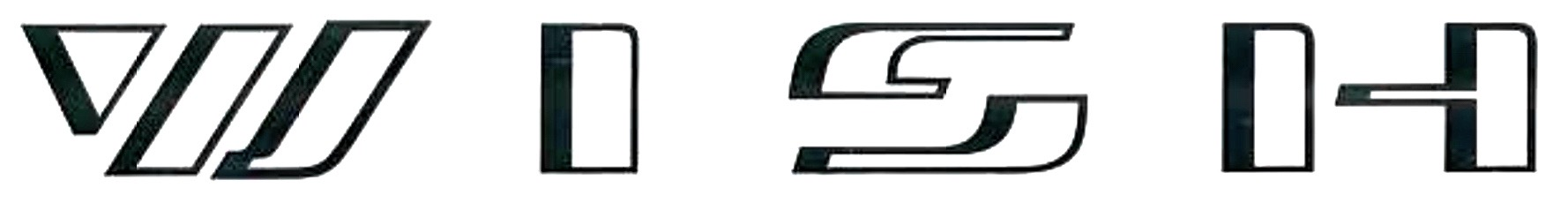
Toyota Wish logo

== First generation (AE10; 2003) ==
First generation
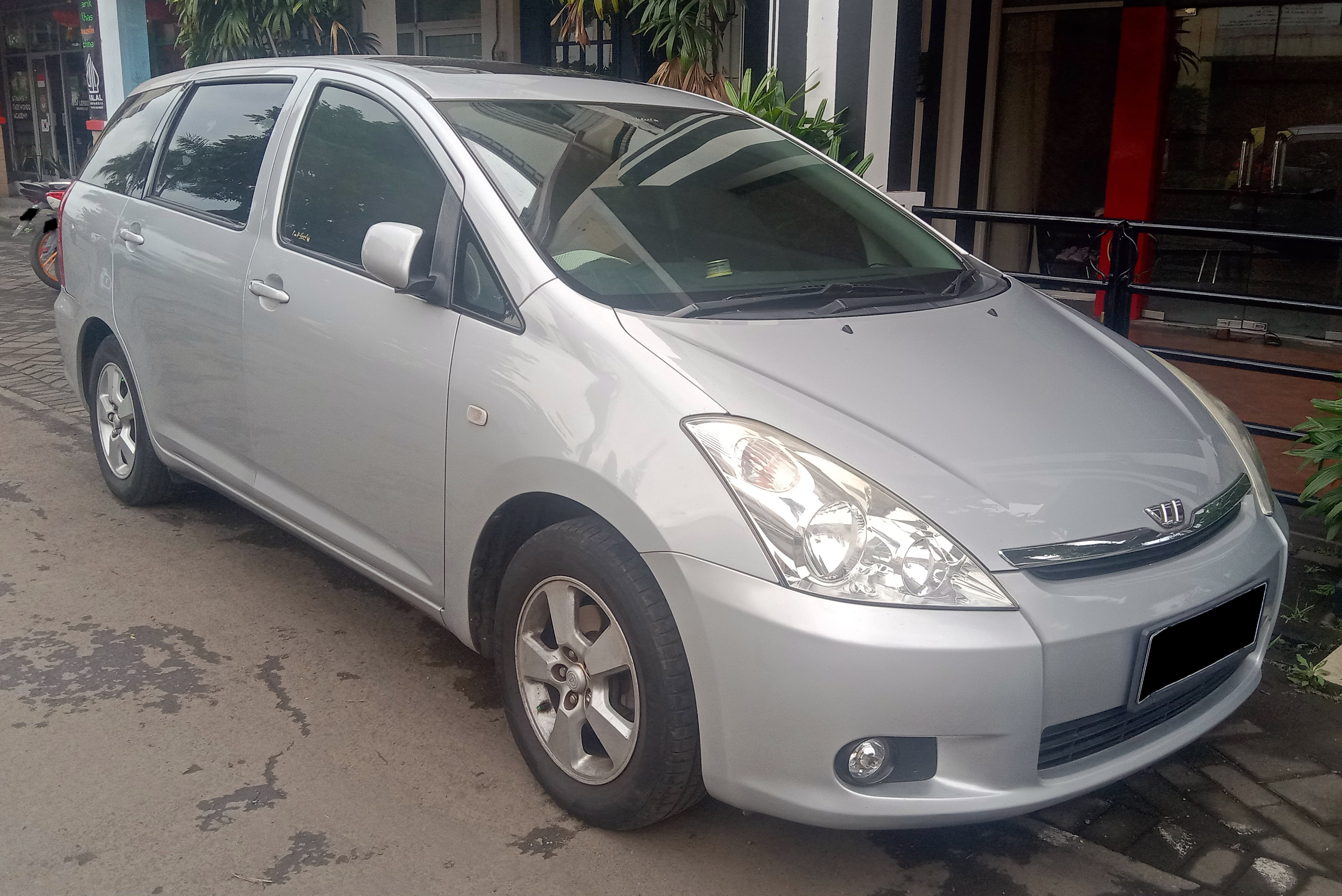
- Pre-facelift Toyota Wish 1.8X

Overview
- Model code: AE10
- Production: January 2003 – April 2009
- Assembly: Japan: Toyota, Aichi; Thailand: Chachoengsao (TMT); Taiwan: Zhongli (Kuozui Motors)
- Designer: Tetsuya Tada

Body and chassis
- Related: Toyota Avensis; Toyota Caldina (T240); Toyota Opa; Toyota Premio (T240); Toyota Prius (XW20); Toyota Vista (V50)

Powertrain
- Engine: 1.8 L 1ZZ-FE; 2.0 L 1AZ-FSE
- Transmission: 4-speed automatic; Super CVT-i

Dimensions
- Wheelbase: 2,750 mm (108.3 in)
- Length: 4,560 mm (179.5 in)
- Width: 1,695 mm (66.7 in)
- Height: 1,590 mm (62.6 in)

=== 2003 ===
The Wish was developed under code name "760N" by the team, led by chief engineer named Takeshi Yoshida and was introduced to the public for the first time at Tokyo Motor Show in October 2002 (Commercial vehicles & Welcab show). The production version launched in 20 January 2003, under a massive publicity campaign with Japanese singer Hikaru Utada. The television commercial features her song Colors, which coincides with the launch of her new CD single. The car was marketed under the "Wish Comes True" slogan.

Codenamed ZNE10G (FWD) and ZNE14G (4WD), it uses a 1.8 L 1ZZ-FE engine, producing (JIS) 132 PS and 170 N⋅m (125 lb⋅ft). It is only available with four-speed automatic. A 2.0 L version (codenamed ANE11W for the six-seater version and ANE10G for the seven-seater version) was launched in April 2003. Equipped with the 1AZ-FSE direct-injection engine, it has (JIS) 155 PS (114 kW) and 192 N·m (142 lb·ft). Variants with the 2.0 D-4 engine are only available with a CVT gearbox.

The WISH was extremely successful in its home market, and is frequently seen on the Top 5 on the 30 bestseller list each month. It has also made shockwave to its competitors, such as the Honda Stream and Mazda Premacy/Mazda5 to changing its market positioning.

The Toyota Wish was also launched as a locally assembled model in Thailand in December 2003 following the compact MPV trend of Thailand at that time. The Wish in Thailand is available with 3 trim levels including 2.0 S, 2.0 Q and 2.0 Q Limited (with sunroof) and is very similar to the Japanese version, except for a few differences:

- Models across the range get the 2.0Z fenders.
- Standard 17-inch wheels across the range (Same design as the one used on the 2.0Z)
- Same 2.0 1AZ-FE engine as the ASEAN Camry instead of the 1AZ-FSE
- No privacy glass (excluding the grey-import variants)
- Leather upholstery as standard on the 2.0Q and 2.0Q Limited
- The rear double wishbone suspension of 4WD models in Japan was fitted to the 2WD model in Thailand as standard. (no Torsion beam rear suspension in Thai version).

=== 2004 ===
The Wish was launched in Taiwan as a left-hand drive vehicle in November 2004. The Taiwanese version shares the same engine as the Thailand model, which means missing out on Toyota's D-4 technology. The Taiwanese assembled version have some styling differences: a new front end, redesigned rear LED tail lights, reflectors recessed into the rear bumper, body color/chrome side rubbing strips and a cleaner chrome rear plate garnish. The WISH badging is not an integral part of the garnish, unlike the Japanese-spec model. Equipment may include parking sensors, dual moonroof and leather seats. Another aspect unique to the Taiwanese Wish is that it can be specified with a beige interior color scheme unlike its Japanese and Thai-built counterparts.

=== 2005 ===
The Wish was received a facelift in September 2005. The original car was fundamentally well designed and that meant that few changes were necessary. Cosmetic changes to the headlights, bumpers, LED tail lights and dashboard were made, together with revised switchgear for the climate control and automatic transmission (The 2.0 Z received a seven-gear transmission.) As the changes were minor the fuel consumption figures, which are the best in the compact MPV class, remain the same. The 2005 Wish was also the third model to be sold exclusively at Toyota Netz dealerships, hence the replacement of the Wish's signature "W" front emblem with a generic NETZ oval as seen on the 2005 Vitz and Ist. Feedback on the electronic throttle control has been mixed, with claims that the original throttle system used in the 2003 car is quicker off the mark. The drivetrain and engines remained the same.

In 2005, exclusively for Japanese-market, G-BOOK ALPHA, a subscription telematics service, was availablec as an option.

=== 2008 ===
In Singapore, the local distributor brought in the Toyota Wish later in 2008 as a compact MPV to buyers there. Instead of the generic Netz oval emblem found on the parallel imported Wish, the local distributor replaced the oval Netz emblem with the Toyota one. Sold as the Wish Aero Tourer to distinguish itself from the parallel import Wish; additional, accessories such as a 5-piece bodykit inclusive of a high mounted rear LED brake light, touchscreen DVD head unit, reverse camera, side mirror indicators, illuminated scuff plates, window visors, chrome muffler tip are featured as standard equipment. Previously, the Wish was only sold by parallel importers.

=== Gallery ===
Japanese market

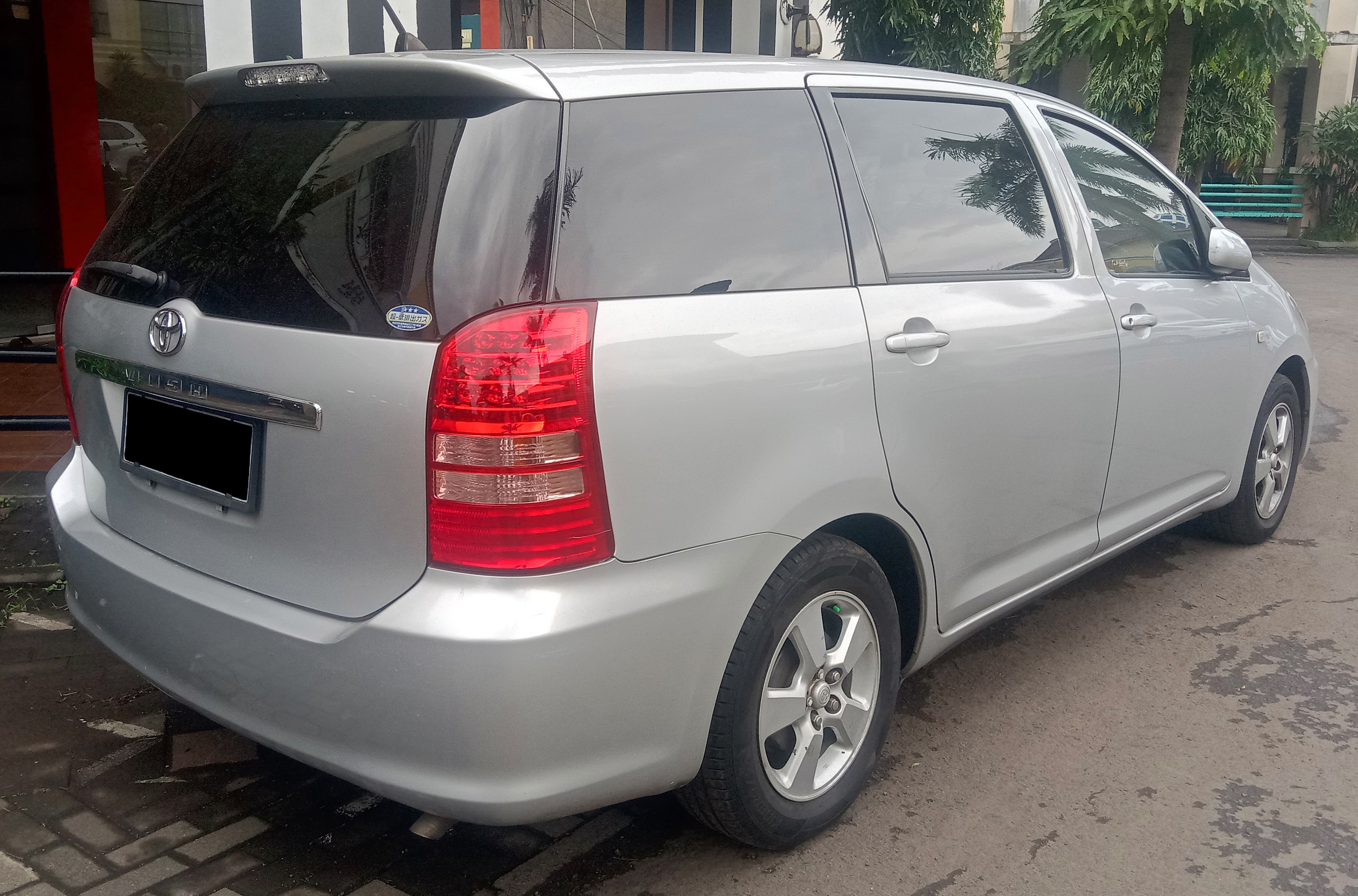
Pre-facelift Toyota Wish 1.8X

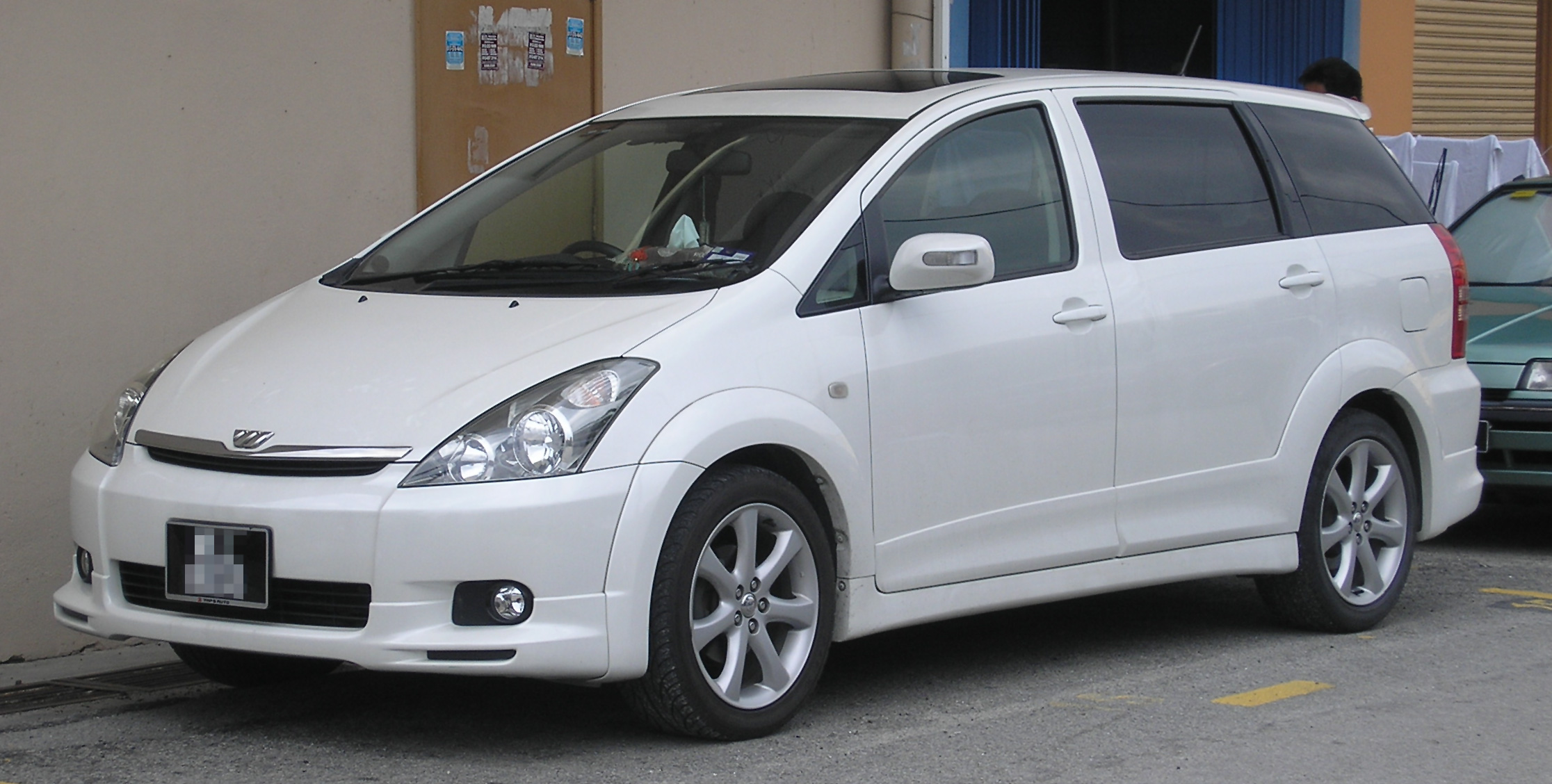
Pre-facelift Toyota Wish 2.0Z

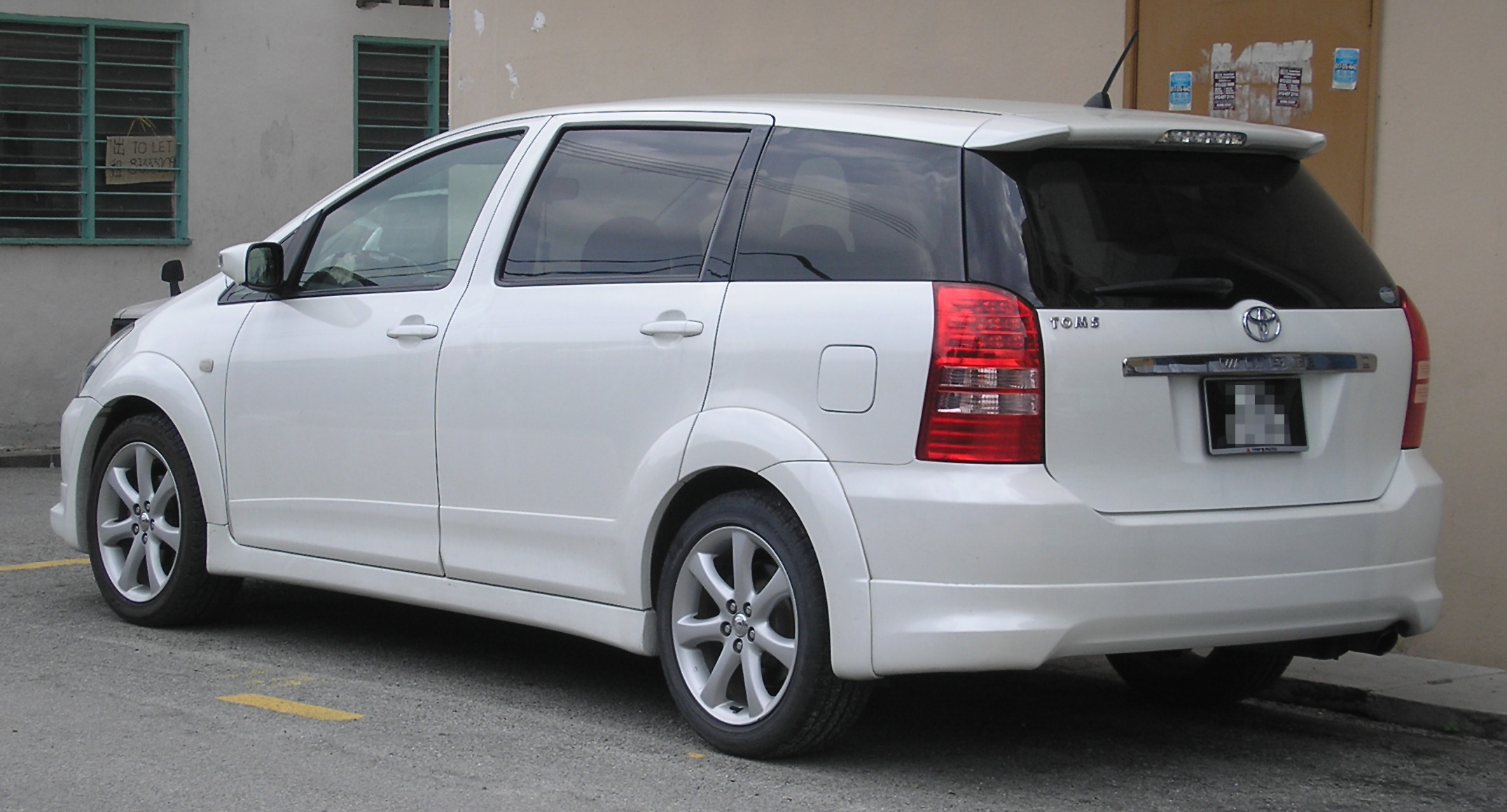
Pre-facelift Toyota Wish 2.0Z

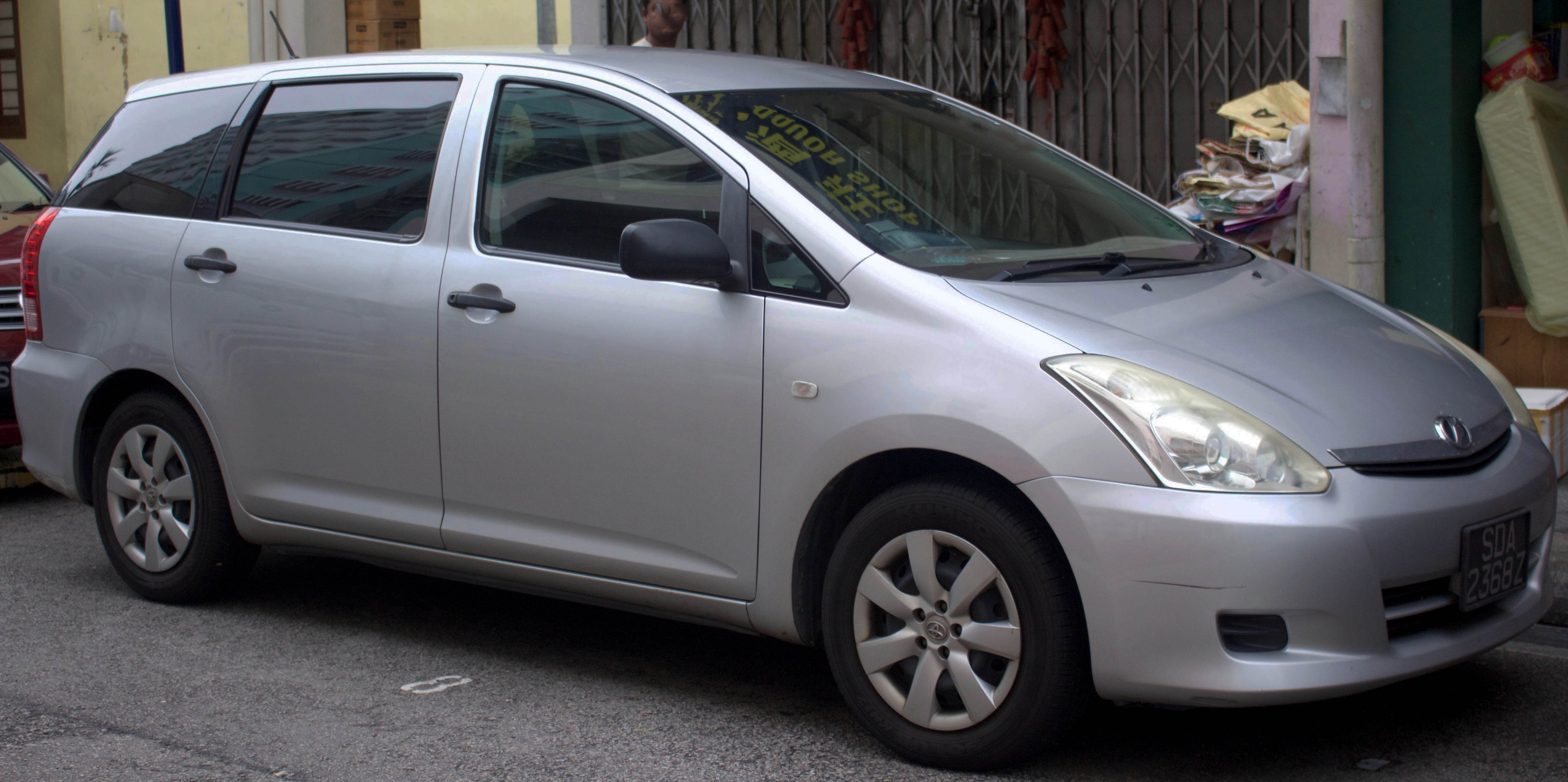
Facelift Toyota Wish 1.8X "E Package"

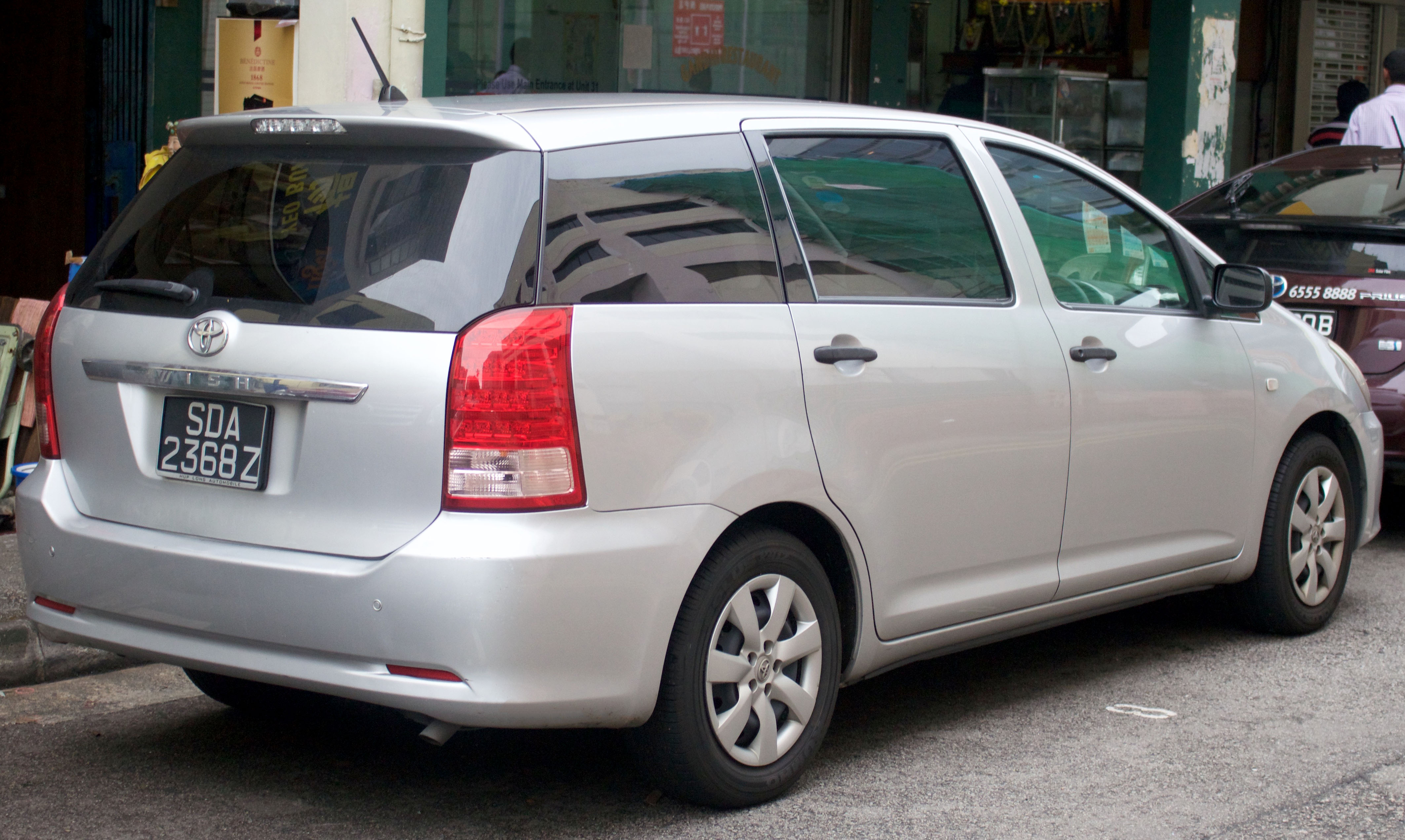
Facelift Toyota Wish 1.8X "E Package"

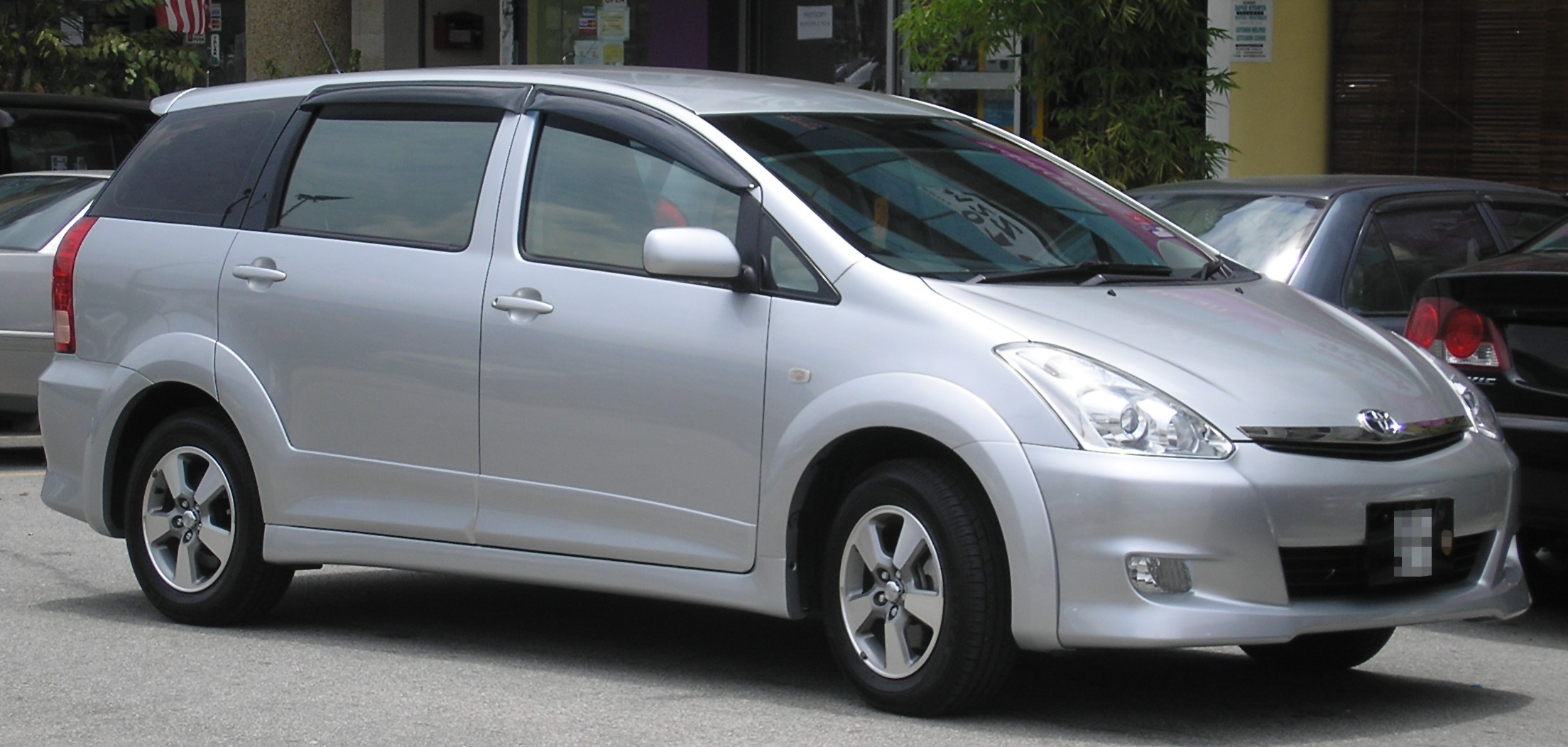
Facelift Toyota Wish 2.0Z

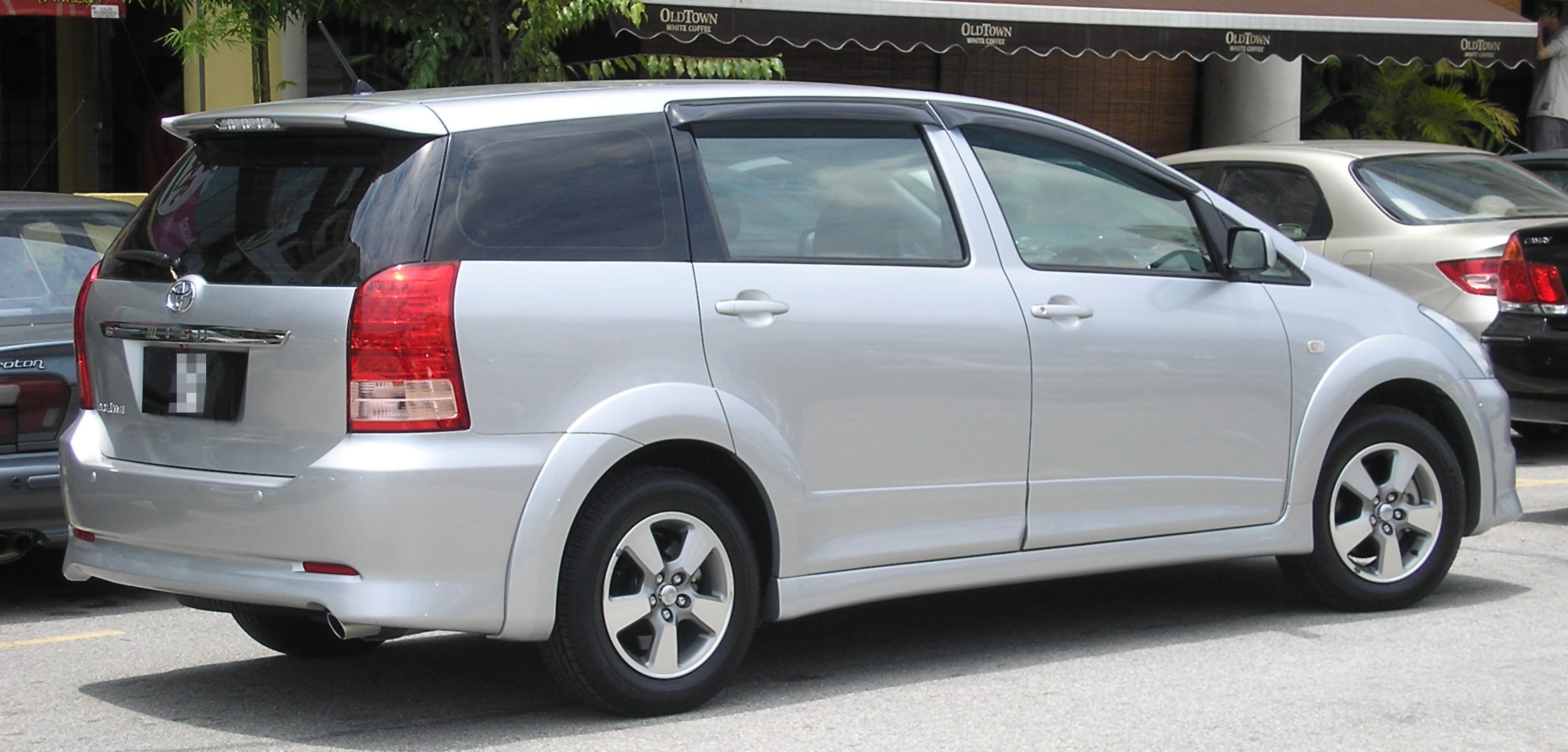
Facelift Toyota Wish 2.0Z

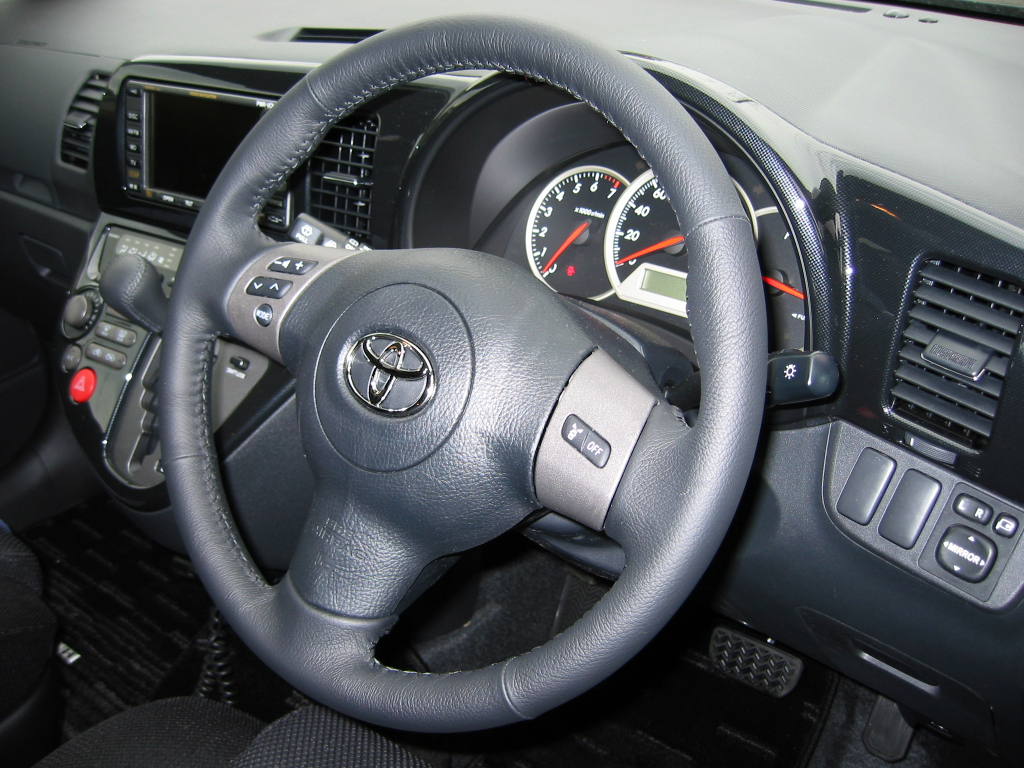
RHD spec interior

Taiwanese market

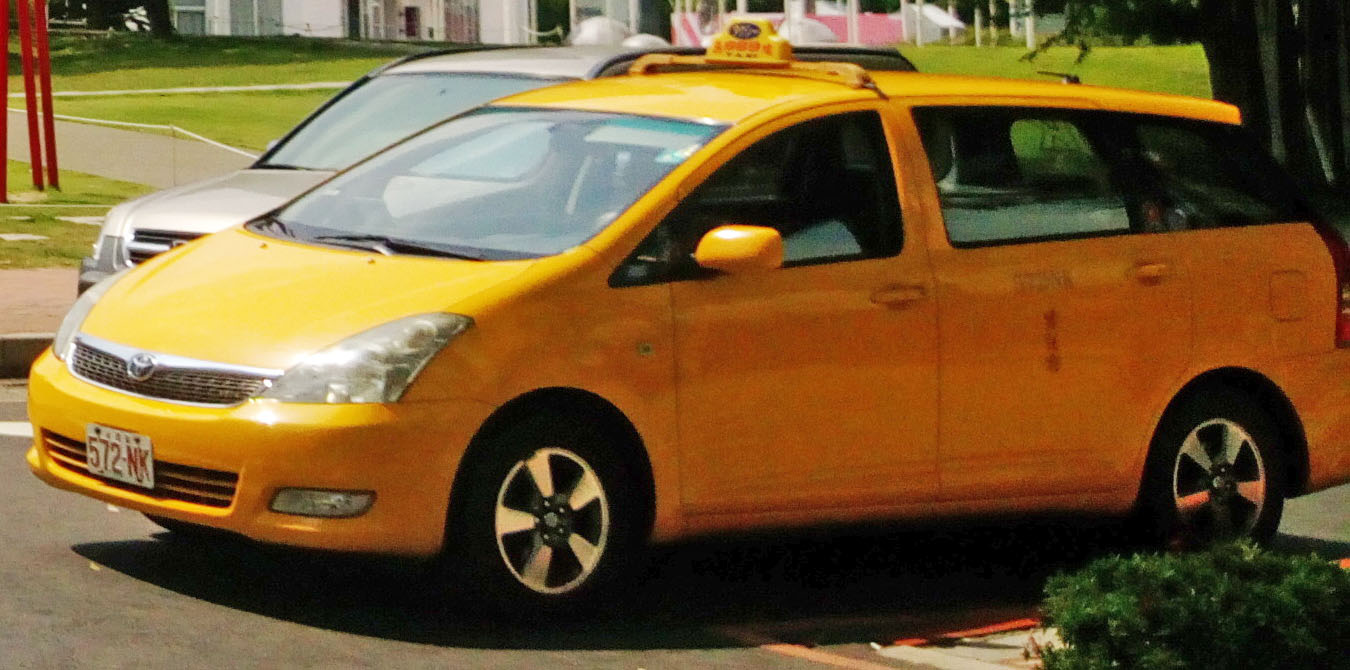
Pre-facelift Toyota Wish as a taxi

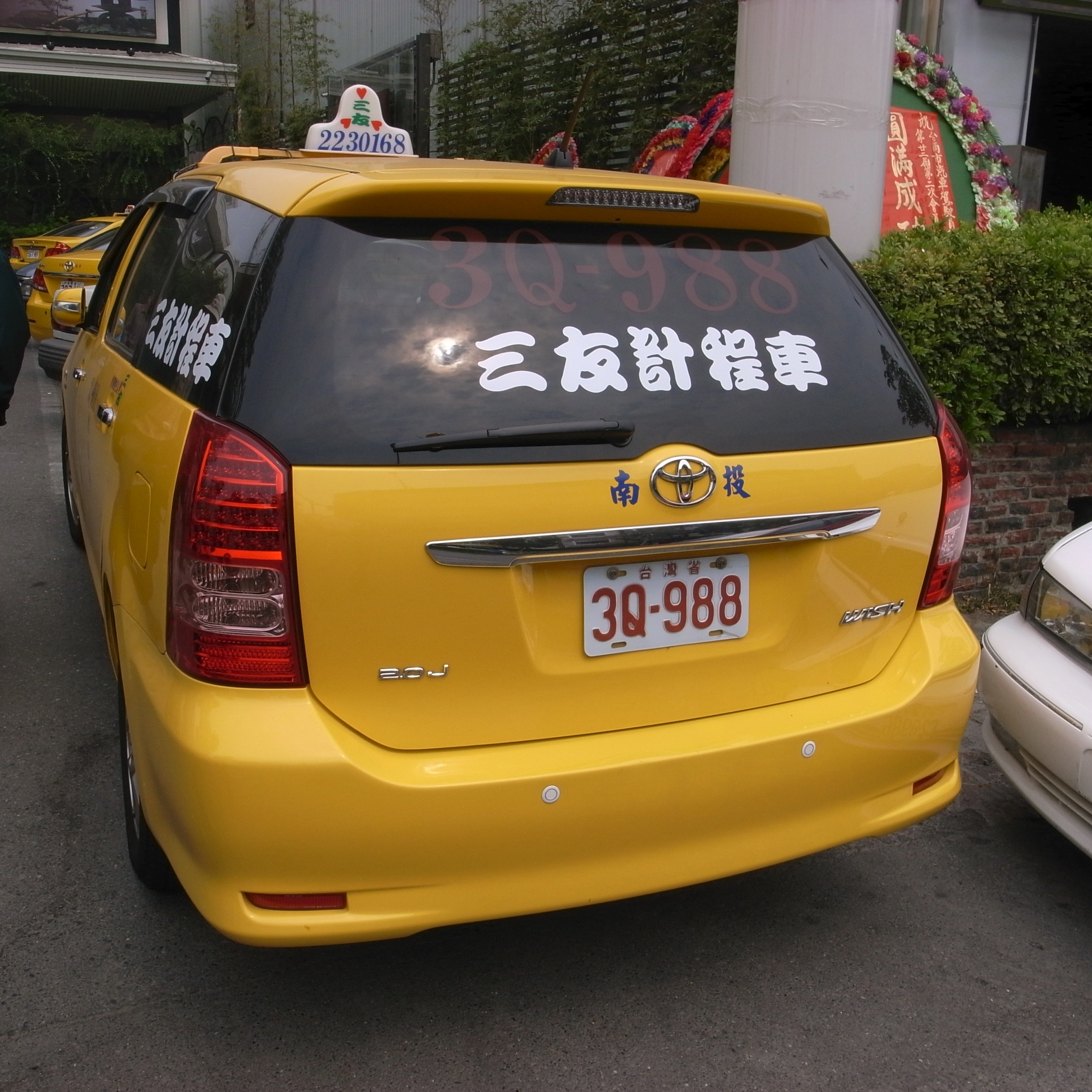
Pre-facelift Toyota Wish 2.0J as a taxi

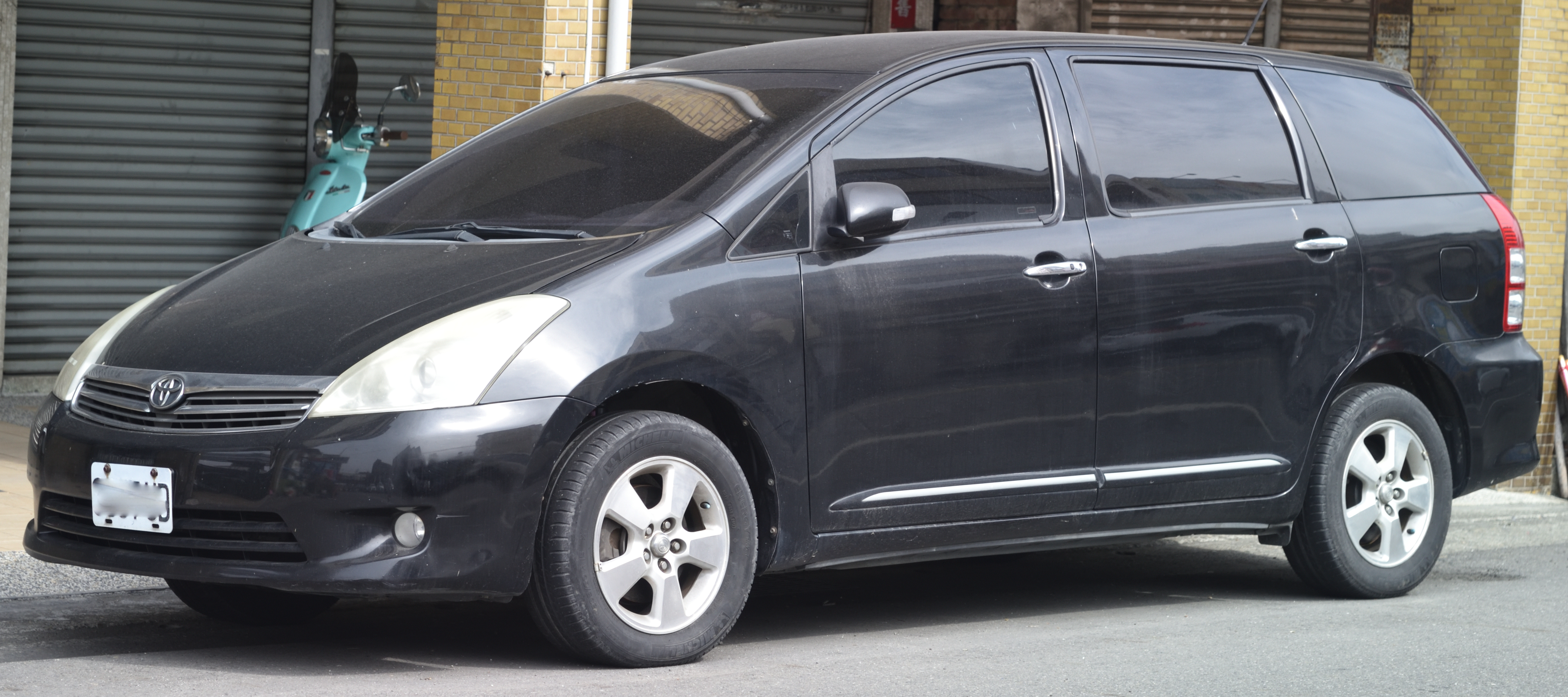
Facelift Toyota Wish

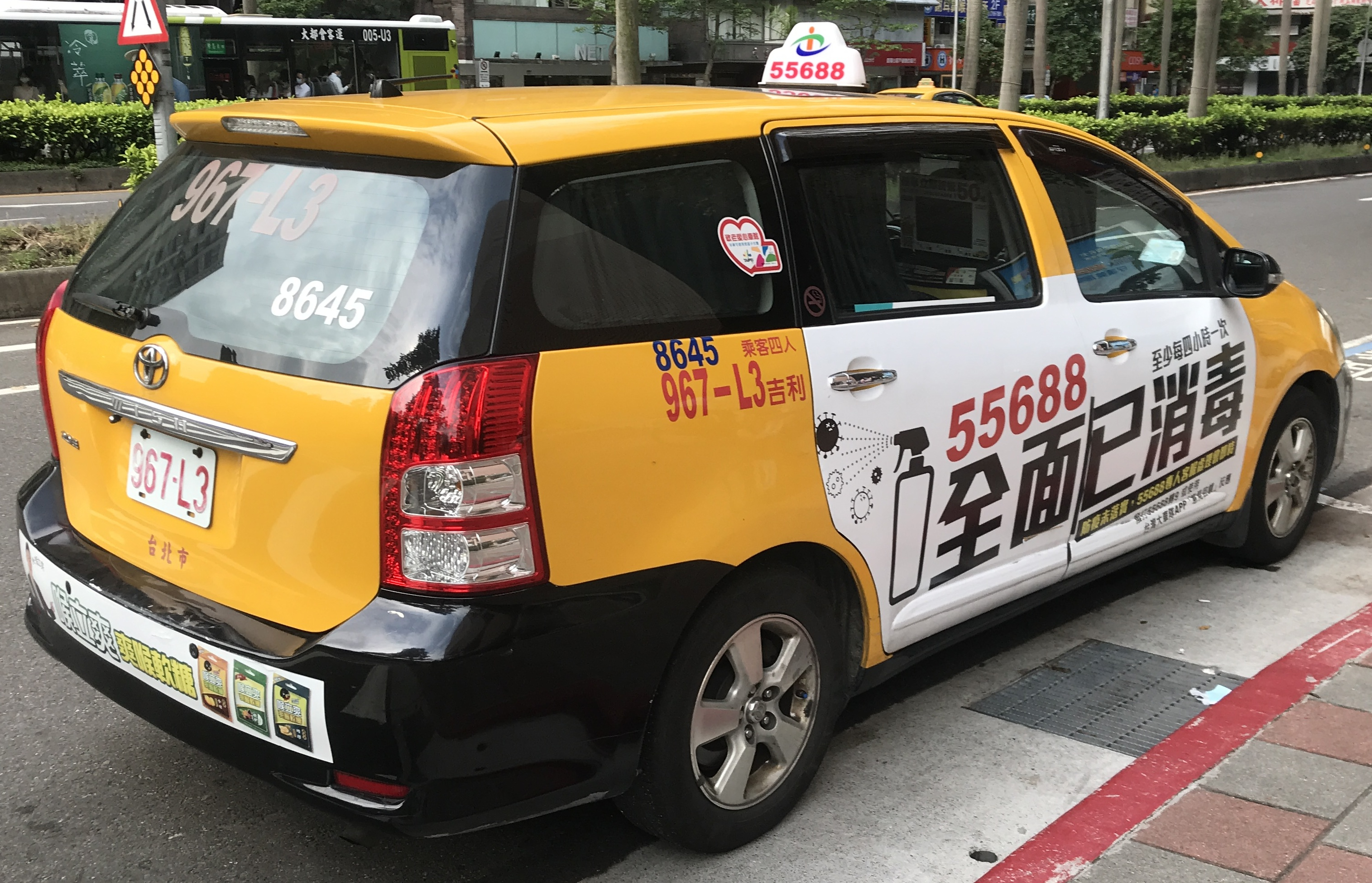
Facelift Toyota Wish as a taxi

== Second generation (AE20; 2009) ==
Second generation
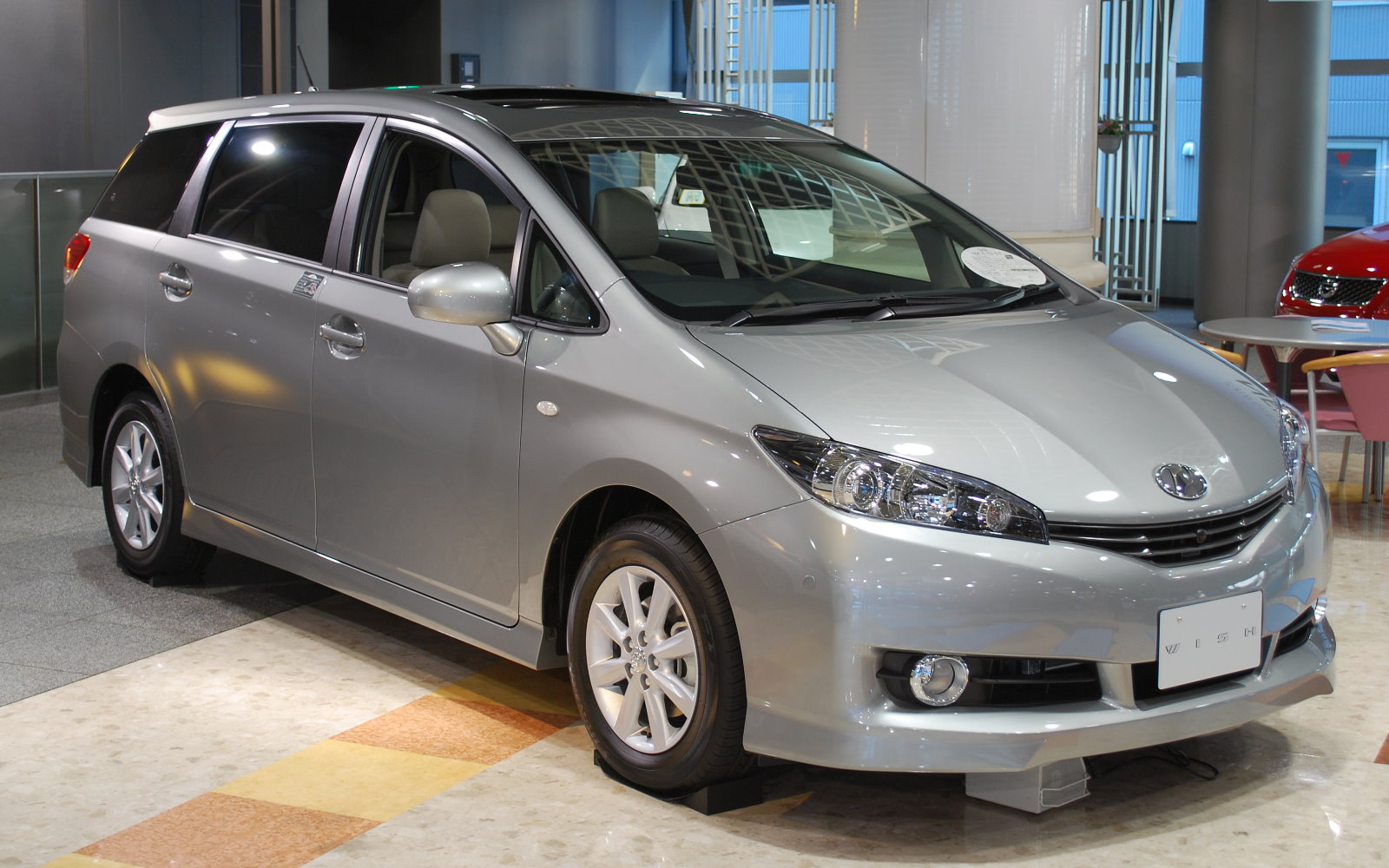
- Pre-facelift Toyota Wish 2.0G

Overview
- Model code: AE20
- Production: 2009–2017
- Assembly: Japan: Toyota, Aichi (Takaoka plant); Tahara, Aichi (Tahara plant); Taiwan: Zhongli (Kuozui Motors)

Body and chassis
- Related: Toyota Premio (T260); Toyota Prius (XW30); Toyota Prius V

Powertrain
- Engine: 1.8 L 2ZR-FAE Valvematic I4; 2.0 L 3ZR-FE I4 (Taiwan); 2.0 L 3ZR-FAE Valvematic I4
- Transmission: 4-speed automatic; 7-speed Super CVT-i

Dimensions
- Wheelbase: 2,750 mm (108.3 in)
- Length: 4,590 mm (180.7 in) (1.8X & 1.8G models); 4,600 mm (181.1 in) (1.8A, 1.8S, & 2.0Z models)
- Width: 1,695 mm (66.7 in); 2.0Z: 1,745 mm (68.7 in)
- Height: 1,590 mm (62.6 in)
- Curb weight: 1,355–1,380 kg (2,987.3–3,042.4 lb)

The second-generation Wish has been available for the Japanese market since March 2009. It is powered by Toyota's Dual VVT-i 2ZR-FAE and 3ZR-FAE engines. All models come with Toyota's 7-speed Super CVT-i transmission. The exterior dimensions remain similar to the previous generation, except for the length which has increased slightly. All versions were seven-seaters, with three seats in the second row, except for the top Z model which has two folding captain's chairs with armrests in the second row and only seats six. The 2.0Z also had wider fenders and somewhat larger bumpers, placing it above a size threshold and in a significantly higher tax category. The 1.8S and 1.8A models were fitted with aero kits which also placed them in the higher, "3 number" tax category.

The second generation Wish continued to be sold outside of the Japanese market in Hong Kong, Singapore, and Taiwan. These models had speedometer clusters that were slightly different from the Japanese market model in the km/h dials section. The Taiwanese models were fitted with a version of the 2-litre engine without variable valve timing.

The Wish received a facelift in April 2012. Cosmetic changes to the headlights and rear lamps featured LED insets, revised front grille, rear tailgate garnish and dashboard meter cluster were made.

=== Body styles ===
2WD

| Chassis code (DBA-) | ZGE22W-HWXQP | ZGE21G-HPXGP | ZGE20W-HPXSP | ZGE20G-HPXEP | ZGE20G-HPXGP | ZGE20G-HPXNP |
|---|---|---|---|---|---|---|
| Model | 2.0Z | 2.0G | 1.8S | 1.8A | 1.8G | 1.8X |
| Engine | 3ZR-FAE | | 2ZR-FAE | | | |
| Seats | 6 | 7 | | | | |

4WD

| Chassis code (DBA-) | ZGE25W-HPXSP | ZGE25G-HPXEP | ZGE25G-HPXGP | ZGE25G-HPXNP |
|---|---|---|---|---|
| Model | 1.8S 4WD | 1.8A 4WD | 1.8G 4WD | 1.8X 4WD |
| Engine | 2ZR-FAE | | | |
| Seats | 7 | | | |

=== Engines ===
| Code | Years | Type/code | Power, torque at rpm |
|---|---|---|---|
| 2ZR-FAE (2WD) | 2009–2017 | 1,797 cc (109.7 cu in) (80.5x88.3mm) I4 | 144 PS (106 kW; 142 hp) at 6,400, 176 N⋅m (130 lb⋅ft) at 4,400 |
| 2ZR-FAE (4WD) | 2009–2017 | 1,797 cc (109.7 cu in) (80.5x88.3mm) I4 | 133 PS (98 kW; 131 hp) at 6,400, 164 N⋅m (121 lb⋅ft) at 4,400 |
| 3ZR-FAE | 2009–2017 | 1,986 cc (121.2 cu in) (80.5x97.6mm) I4 | 158 PS (116 kW; 156 hp) at 6,200, 196 N⋅m (145 lb⋅ft) at 4,400 |

=== Transmissions ===
| Model(s) | Type |
|---|---|
| 1.8S | Super CVT-i with 7-speed sport sequential shiftmatic with CVT Sport Mode |
| 1.8A, 1.8G, 1.8X | Super CVT-i with 7-speed sport sequential shiftmatic |
| 2.0Z | Super CVT-i with 7-speed sport sequential shiftmatic with Dynamic Sport Mode |

=== Handling ===
All models include safety features such as ABS with EBD and BA. Additional features include TCS and VSC. All models include front ventilated and rear disc brakes with the exception of 1.8X 2WD (which include rear drums).

=== Gallery ===
Japanese market

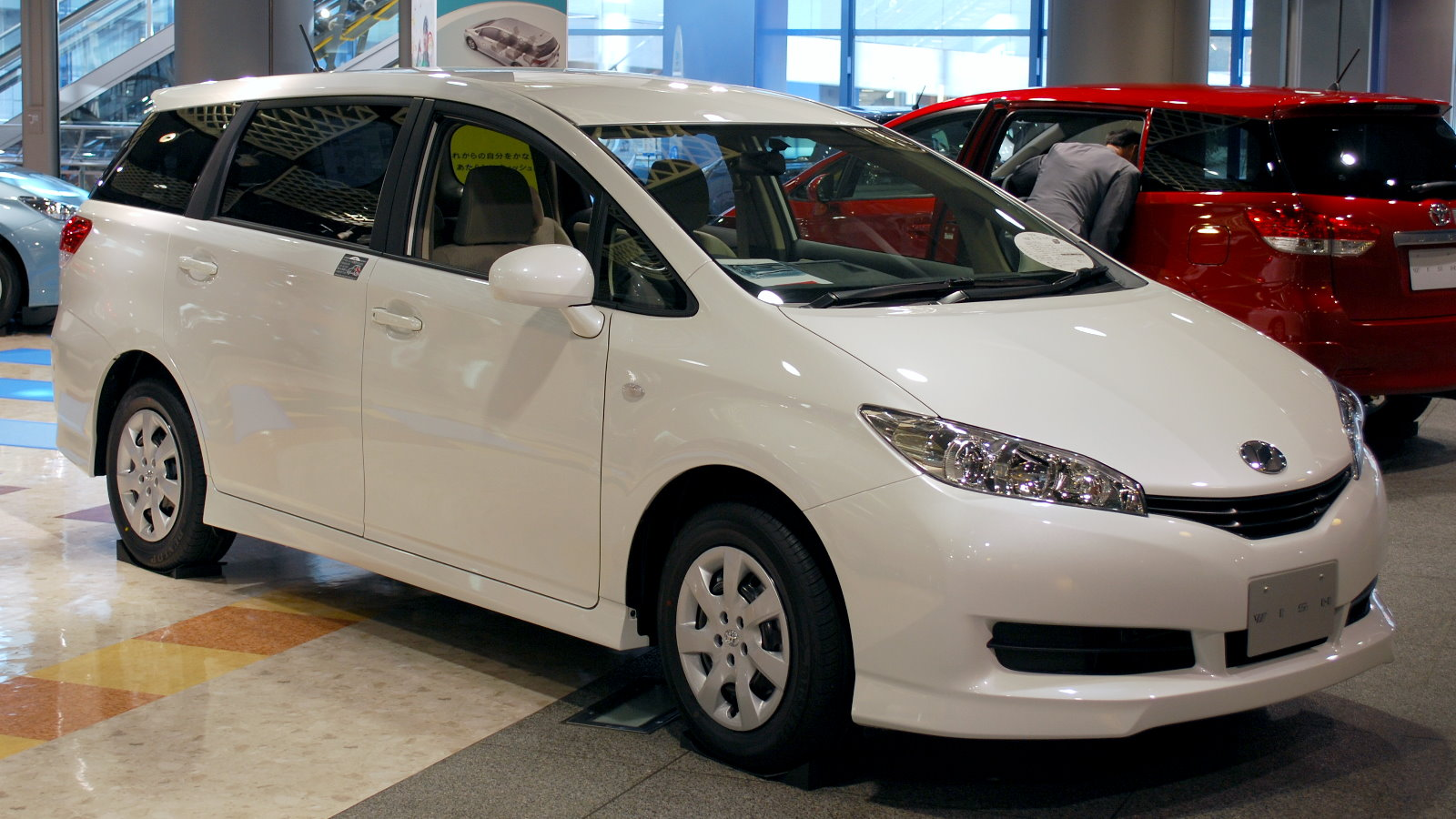
Pre-facelift Toyota Wish 1.8X

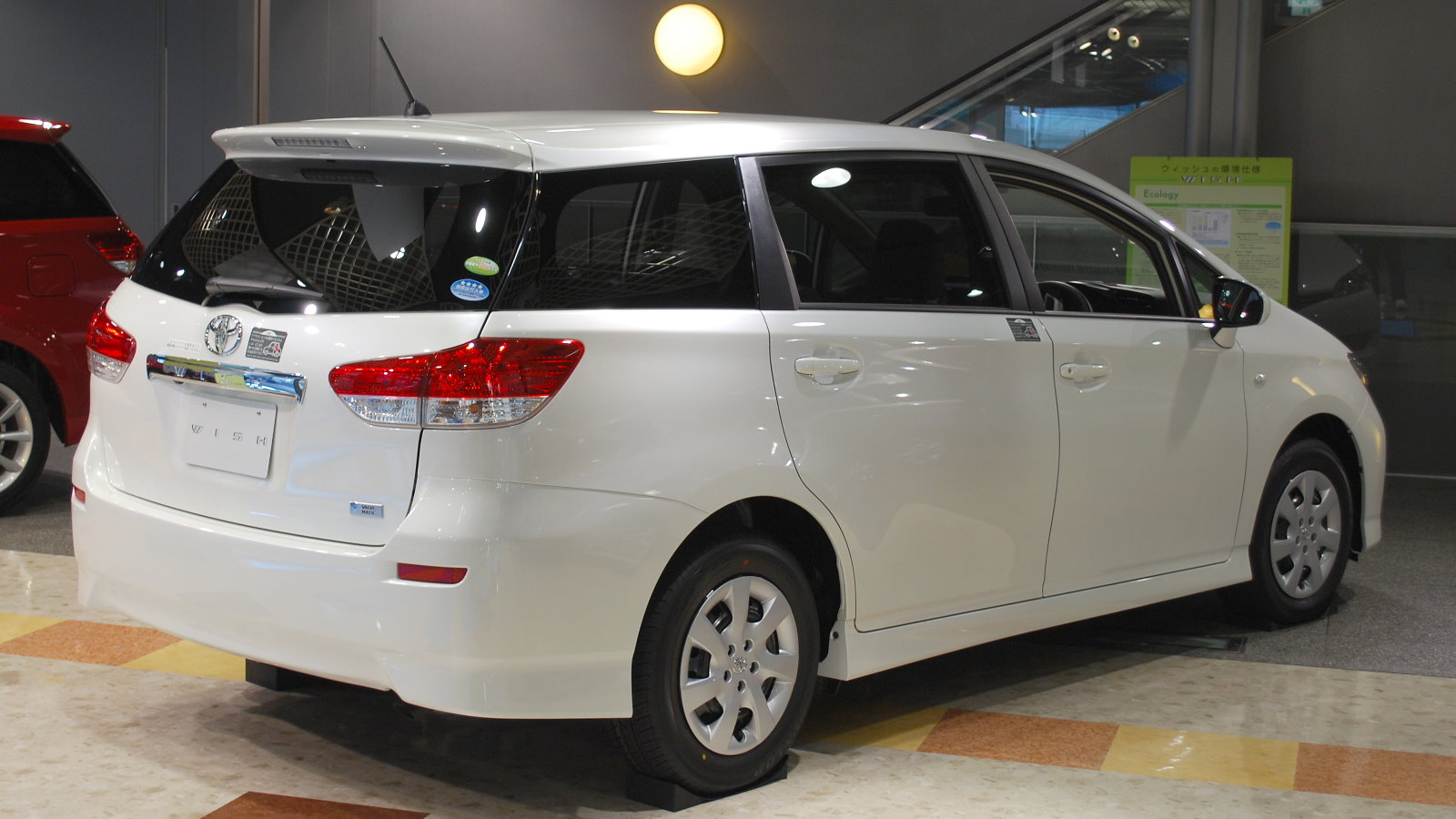
Pre-facelift Toyota Wish 1.8X

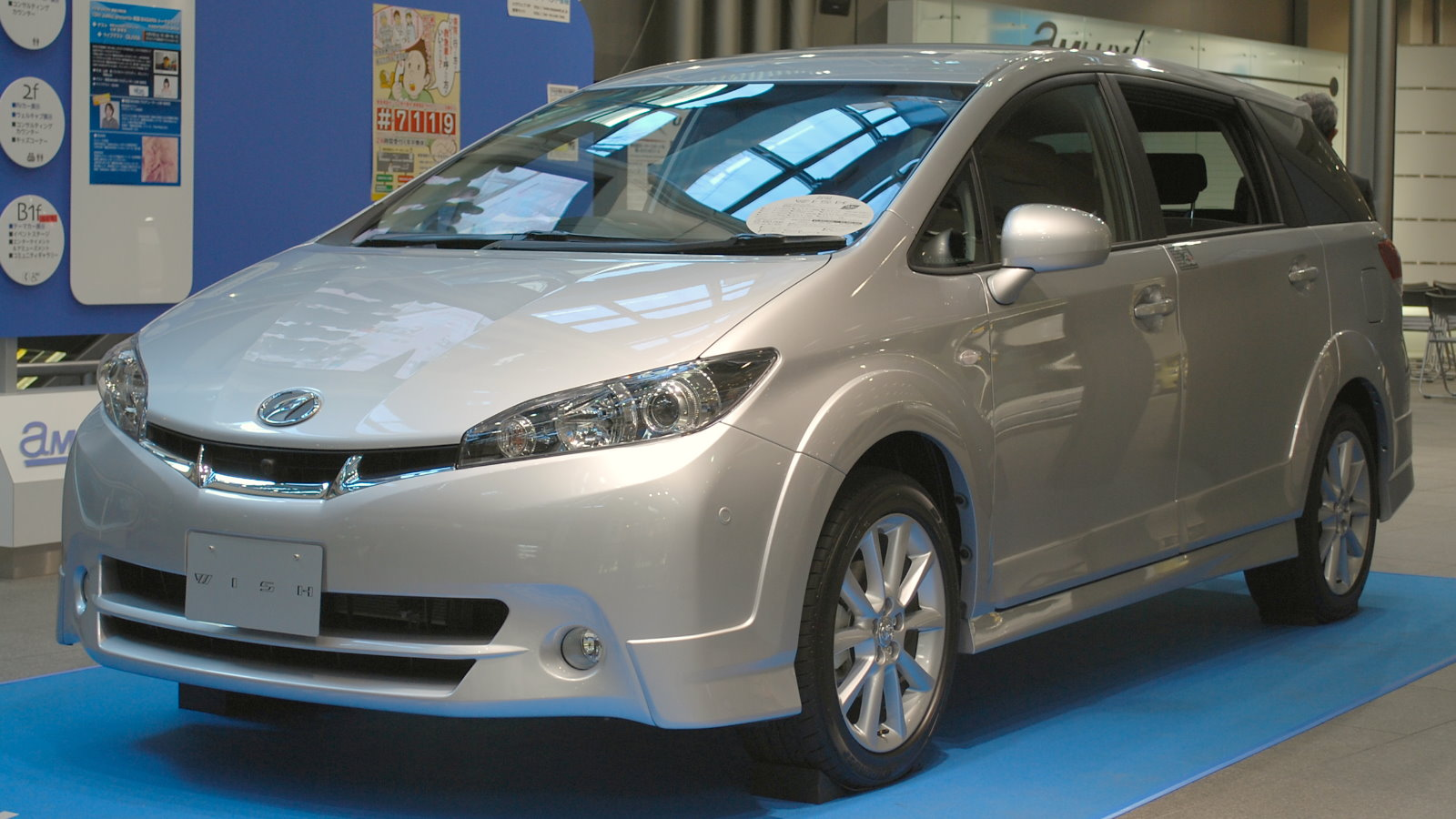
Pre-facelift Toyota Wish 2.0Z

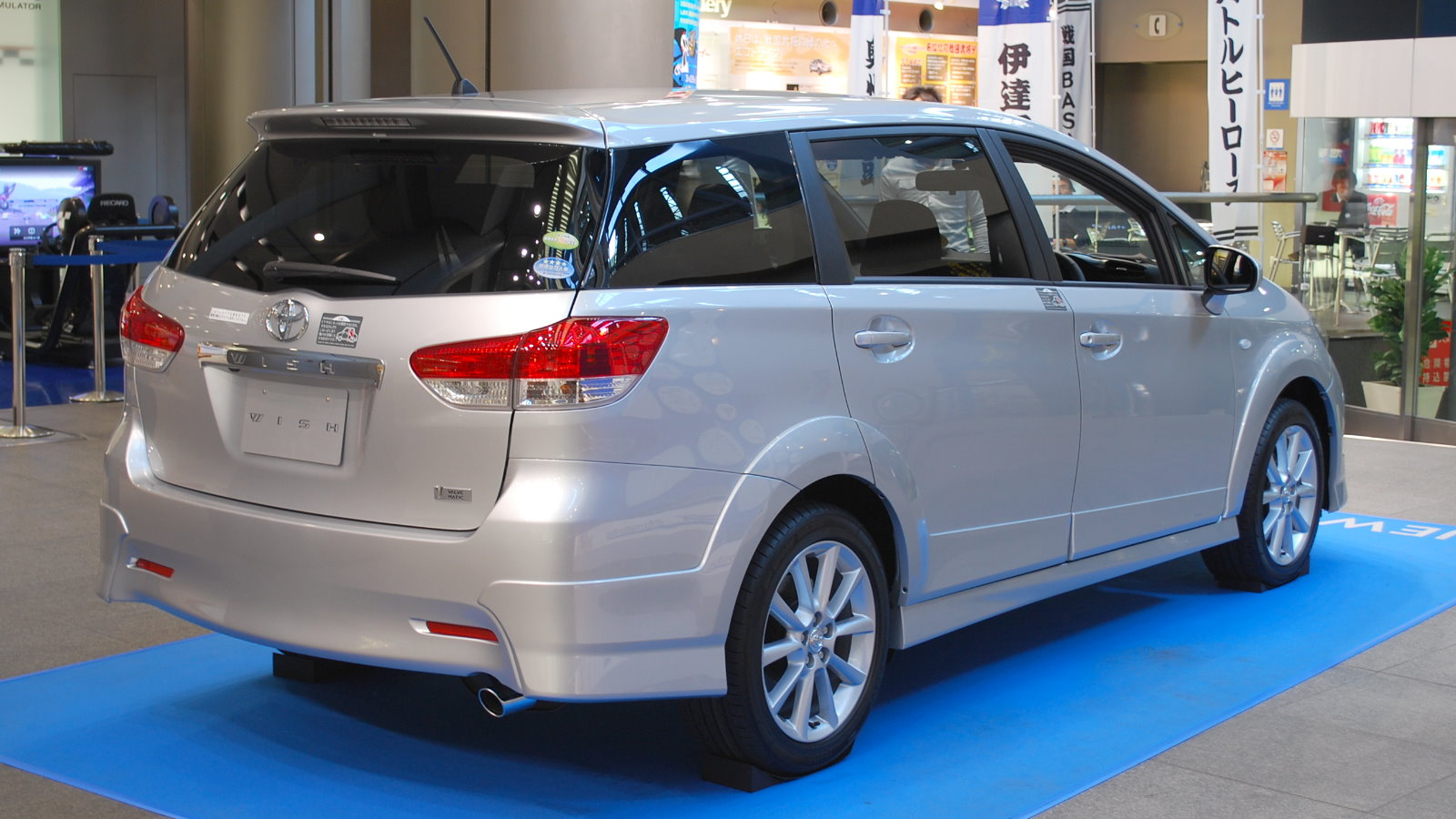
Pre-facelift Toyota Wish 2.0Z

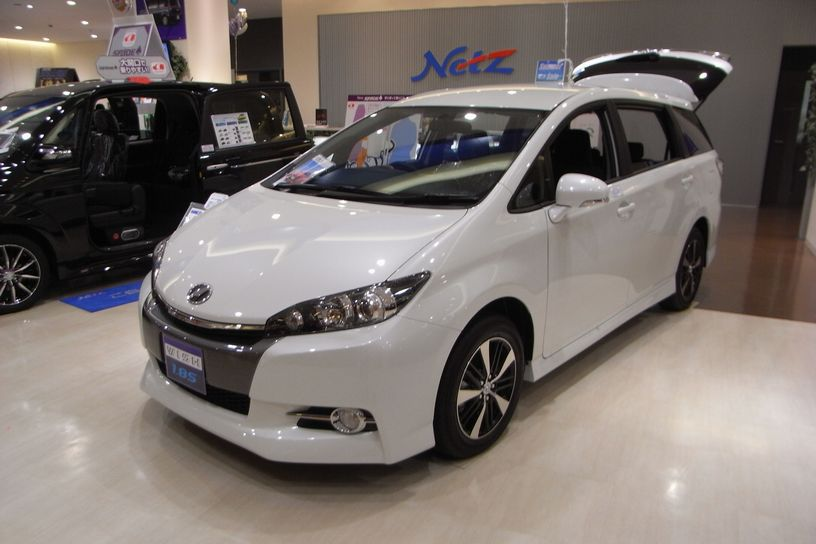
Facelift Toyota Wish 1.8S

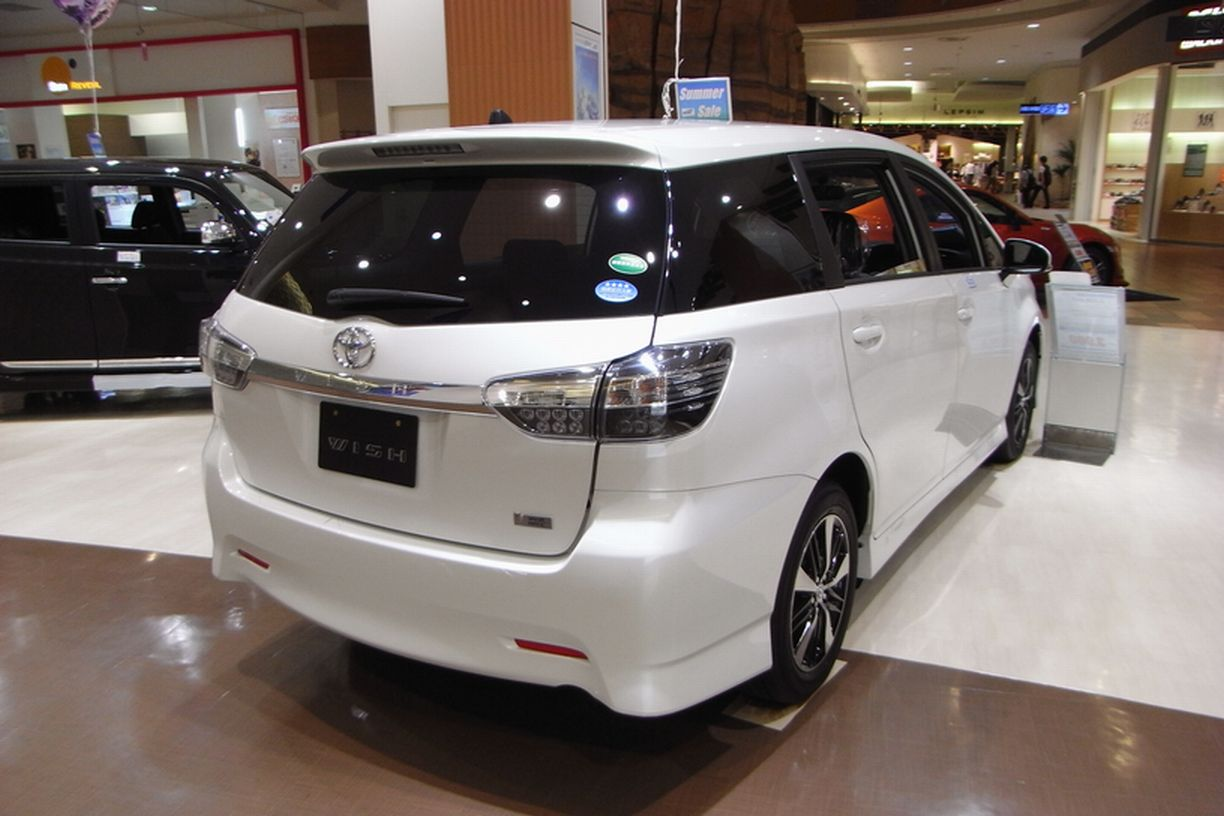
Facelift Toyota Wish 1.8S

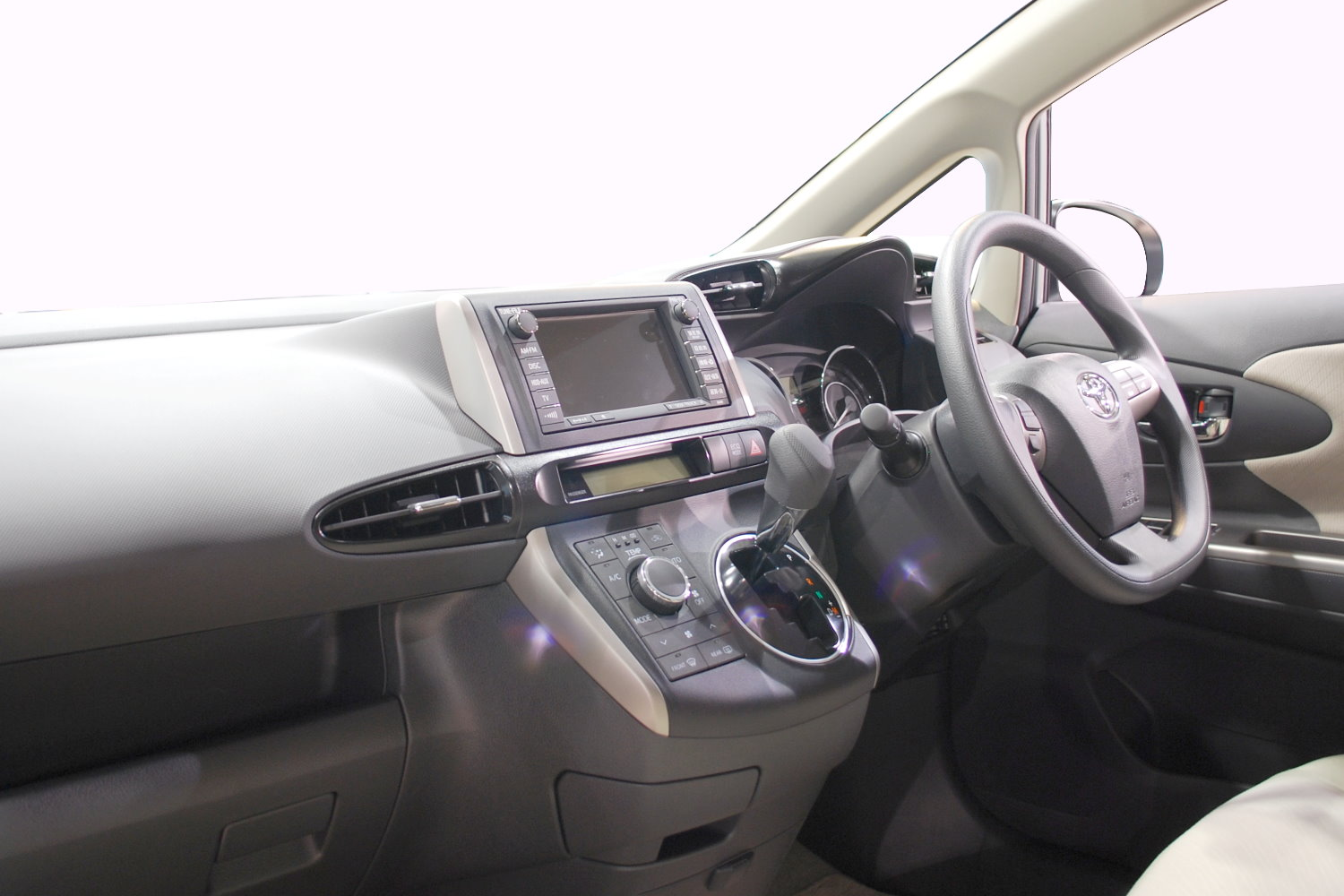
RHD spec interior

Taiwanese market

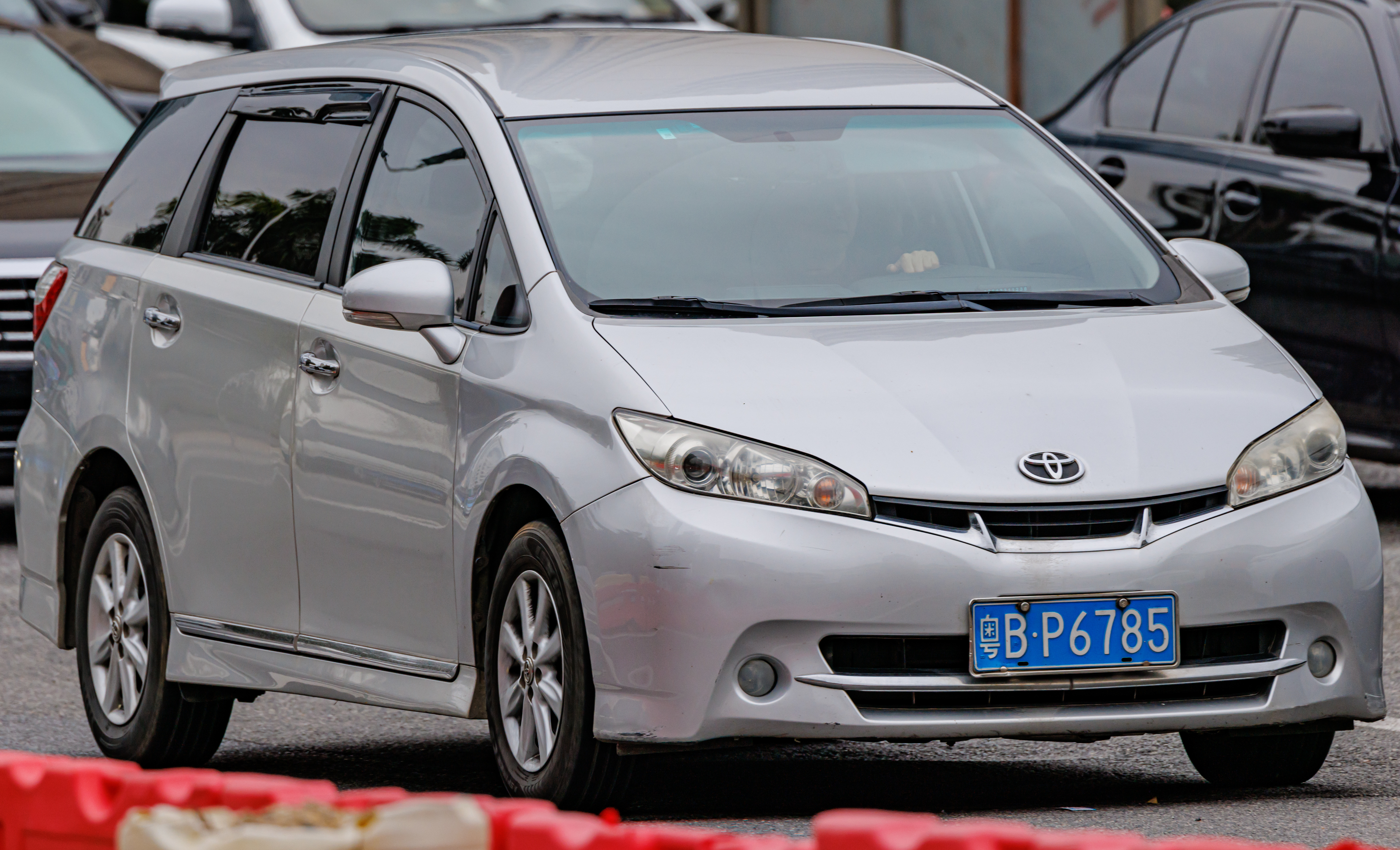
Pre-facelift Toyota Wish in China

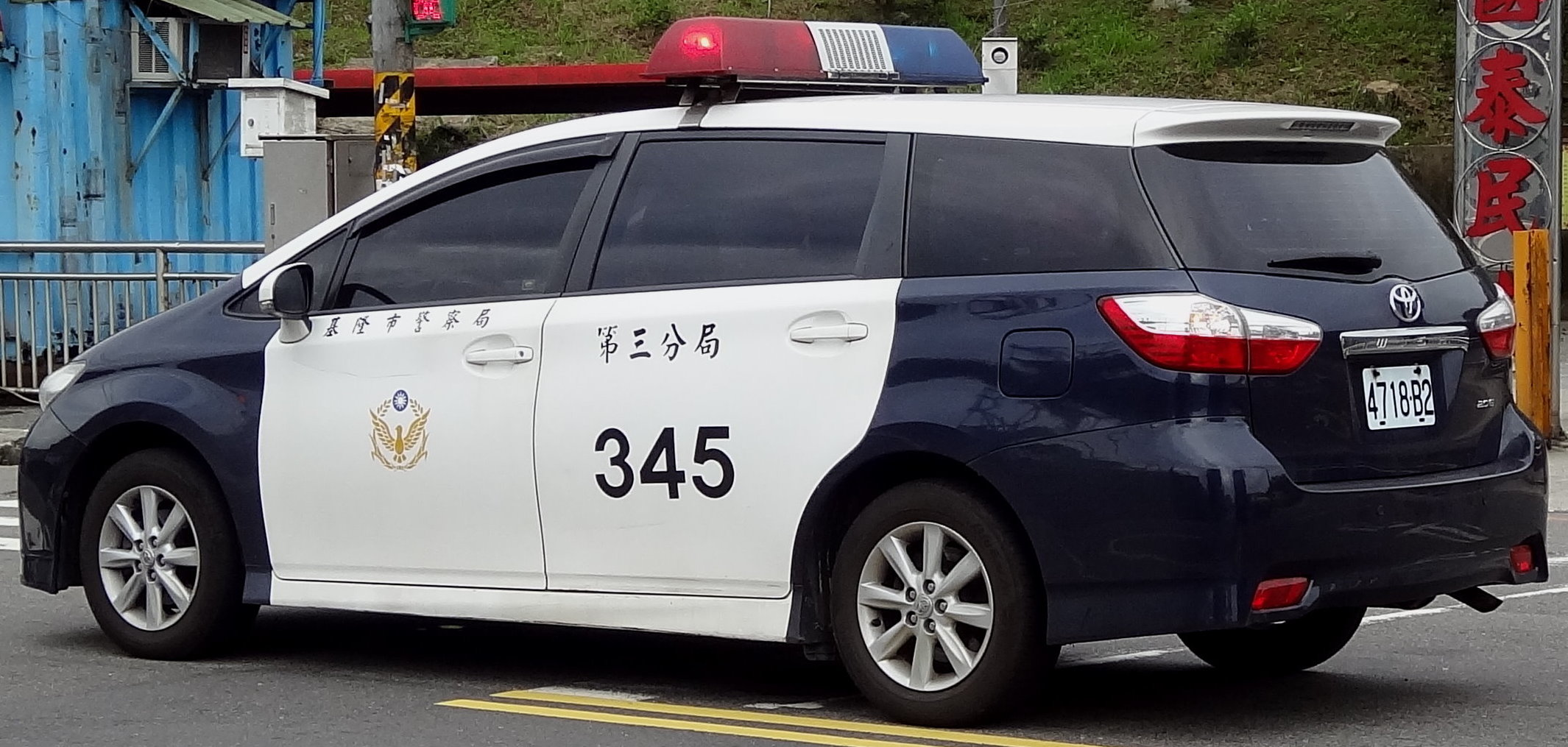
Pre-facelift Toyota Wish 2.0E as a police car

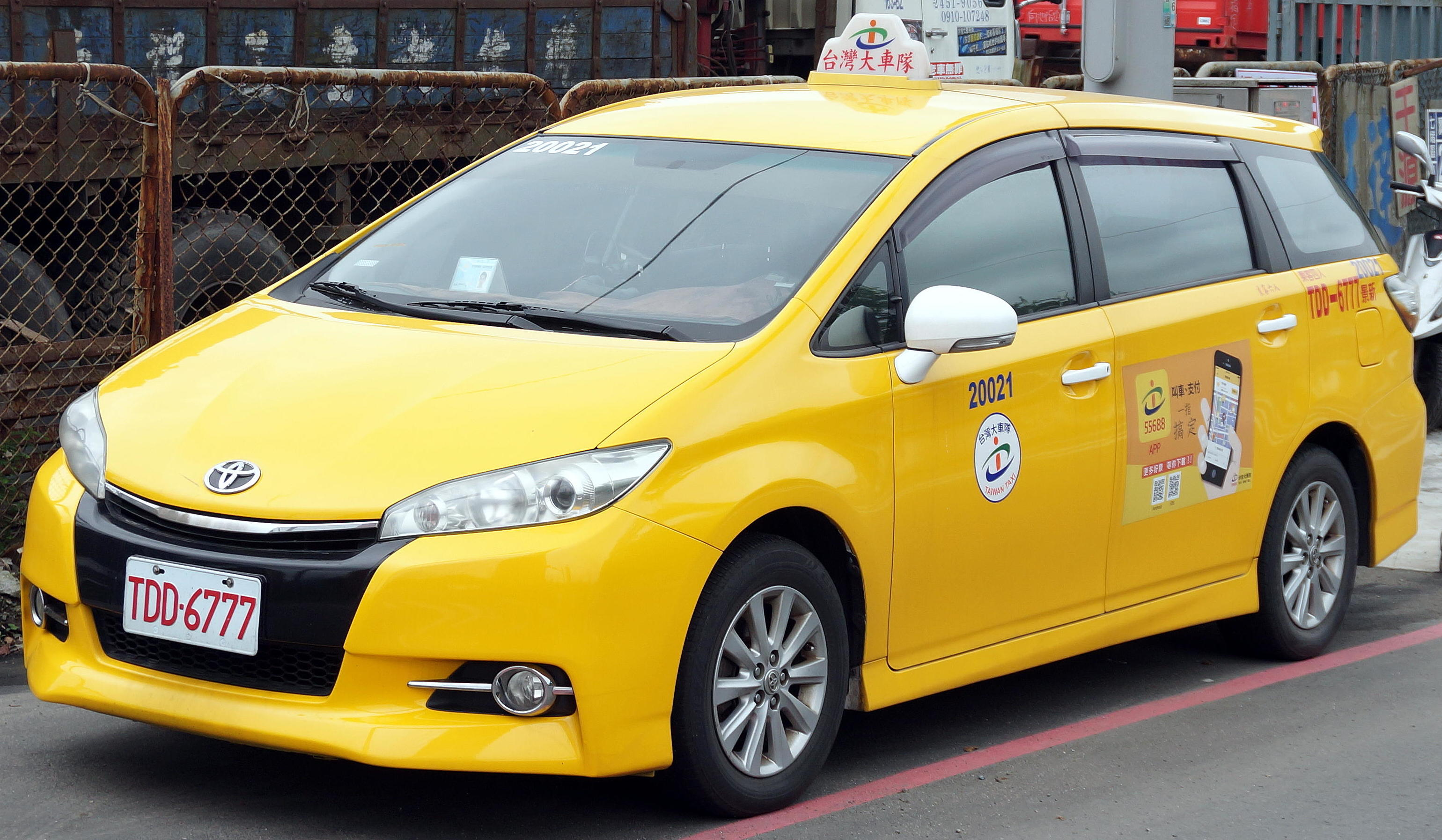
Facelift Toyota Wish as a taxi

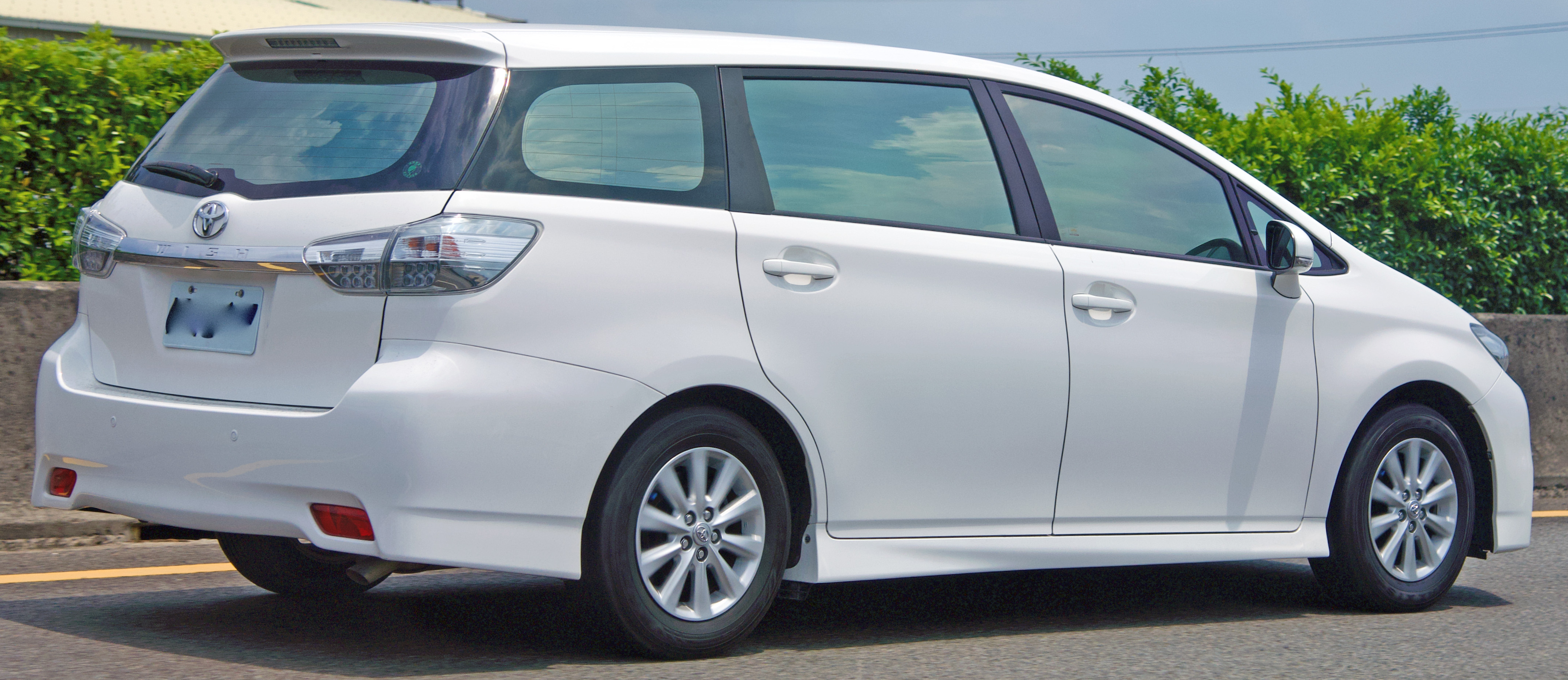
Facelift Toyota Wish

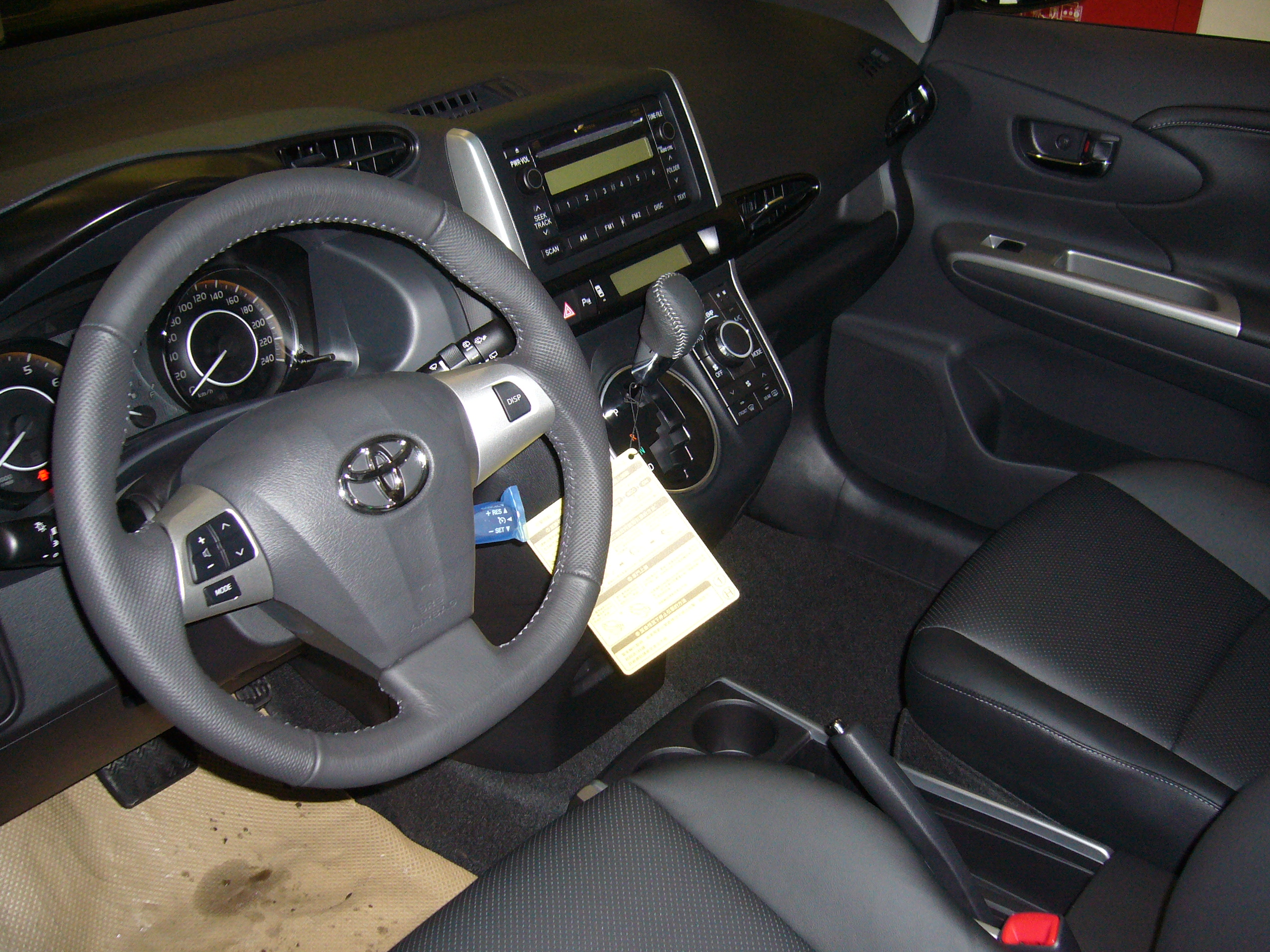
LHD spec interior

== Discontinuation ==
Sales of the Wish was discontinued in Taiwan in 2016, where it was replaced by the Sienta, and was also discontinued in Japan on 13 October 2017 and in Singapore in mid 2018, where Prius α and the Sienta replaced the outgoing Wish. In Japan, the role of the Wish as a three-row compact MPV is effectively replaced by the Sienta, the Prius α and the tall-bodied Noah/Voxy/Esquire triplets.
