= Song for You (Misia song) =

Song by Misia

from the album Ascension
- Released: August 1, 2005
- Recorded: 2004; Victor Studio (Tokyo), Rhythmedia Studio (Tokyo)
- Genre: Pop
- Length: 5:59
- Label: Rhythmedia Tribe
- Composer(s): Katsunori Hoshi
- Lyricist(s): Misia
- Producer(s): Hoshi

"Song for You" is a song by Japanese recording artist Misia. It was performed throughout The Tour of Misia 2005 The Singer Show and was subsequently released on a bonus CD single with the first pressing of the tour DVD. The song and its instrumental version were released as a digital single on August 1, 2005.

On August 22, 2007, a live version of the song performed at a Hoshizora no Live IV concert in Niigata was digitally distributed in Chaku-Uta format and a portion of the proceeds were donated to relief efforts for the 2007 Chūetsu offshore earthquake.

== Track listing ==
No.	Title	Lyrics	Music	Length
1.	"Song for You"	Misia	Katsunori Hoshi	5:59
2.	"Song for You (Instrumental)"		Hoshi	5:56
