= Ascension (Misia album) =

Studio album by Misia
- Released: February 7, 2007
- Genres: R&B; soul; pop; dance; lounge; house
- Length: 73:54 (Regular edition); 83:58 (First press edition); 78:33 (Re-release edition)
- Labels: Rhythmedia Tribe; BMG Japan (Re-release)
- Producer: Misia

Misia chronology
Singer for Singer (2004)	Ascension (2007)	Eighth World (2008)

Alternative covers
- First press cover

Singles from Ascension
- 1. "Song for You" Released: August 1, 2005; 2. "Shinin' (Nijiiro no Rhythm)" Released: November 22, 2005; 3. "Luv Parade/Color of Life" Released: July 5, 2006; 4. "Sea of Dreams" Released: July 12, 2006

Ascension is the seventh studio album by Japanese R&B singer Misia, released on February 7, 2007. It is her first album in over two years and last to be released under the Avex subsidiary Rhythmedia Tribe. The album was later re-released under BMG Japan.

The album is certified Gold for shipment of 100,000 copies.

== Track listing ==
No.	Title	Lyrics	Music	Length
1.	"Color of Life"	Misia	Misia, Joi	4:42
2.	"Future Funk"	Misia, Tiger	Sakoshin	4:02
3.	"Remember Lady"	Misia	Jun Sasaki	4:52
4.	"TYO"	Misia	Misia, Sakoshin	3:45
5.	"Taiyō ga Kureta Present" (太陽がくれたプレゼント Taiyō ga Kureta Purezento, "Present from the Sun")	Misia	Misia, Mits Ishibashi	4:07
6.	"Stay in My Heart"	Misia	Sinkiroh	6:52
7.	"Tsuki" (月, "Moon")	Kazufumi Miyazawa	Sinkiroh	5:05
8.	"Shinin' (Nijiiro no Rhythm)" (SHININ' ～虹色のリズム～ SHININ' ~Nijiiro no Rizumu~, "Shinin' (A Rainbow Rhythm)")	Misia	Joi	5:11
9.	"Suna no Shiro" (砂の城, "Sand Castle")	Hiroshi Takano	Sinkiroh	4:47
10.	"Angel"	Misia, Shusui, Anders Dannvik	Shusui, Dannvik	4:32
11.	"Luv Parade"	Misia	Andreas Grill, Nick Malmestrom	4:09
12.	"We Are the Music"	Misia	Toshiaki Matsumoto	5:37
13.	"Song for You"	Misia	Katsunori Hoshi	5:54
14.	"Hoshi no Ginka" (星の銀貨, "Silver Star Coin")	Misia	Sasaki	5:00

First press bonus track
No.	Title	Lyrics	Music	Length
15.	"Sea of Dreams"	Misia	John Kavanaugh	4:40

Re-release bonus track
No.	Title	Lyrics	Music	Length
15.	"Rio"	Joi	Joi	5:23

== Charts ==
=== Oricon sales charts ===
Release date	Chart	Peak position
February 7, 2007	Oricon Daily Albums Chart	2
February 7, 2007	Oricon Weekly Albums Chart	2
February 7, 2007	Oricon Monthly Albums Chart	7
February 7, 2007	Oricon Yearly Albums Chart	91

=== Physical sales charts ===
Chart	Peak position
Oricon Daily Albums Chart	2
Oricon Weekly Albums Chart	2
Oricon Monthly Albums Chart	7
Oricon Yearly Albums Chart	91
G-Music J-pop Chart (Taiwan)	10
Five Music J-pop/K-pop Chart (Taiwan)	9
Soundscan Albums Chart	2

== Release history ==
Regular and first press editions
Country	Date	Label	Catalog
Japan	February 7, 2007	Rhythmedia Tribe	RXCD-21084
Taiwan	March 9, 2007	Avex Taiwan	
Korea	April 27, 2007	S.M. Entertainment	

Re-release edition
Country	Date	Label	Catalog
Japan	December 17, 2008	BMG Japan	BVCS-21044
Taiwan	January 9, 2009	Sony Music Taiwan	
