= Sea of Dreams (Misia song) =

"Sea of Dreams: Tokyo DisneySea 5th Anniversary Theme Song"

Single by Misia

from the album Ascension
- Released: July 12, 2006
- Recorded: 2006
- Genre: Pop
- Length: 4:39
- Label: Rhythmedia Tribe, Walt Disney
- Songwriter(s): Misia, John Kavanaugh
- Producer(s): Kavanaugh

Misia singles chronology
"Luv Parade/Color of Life" (2006)	"Sea of Dreams: Tokyo DisneySea 5th Anniversary Theme Song" (2006)	"Any Love" (2007)

"Sea of Dreams: Tokyo DisneySea 5th Anniversary Theme Song" is the sixteenth single by Japanese recording artist Misia. It was released on July 12, 2006, and was included as a bonus track on the first pressing of Misia's seventh studio album Ascension.

== Background ==
"Sea of Dreams: Tokyo DisneySea 5th Anniversary Theme Song" was released only a week after "Luv Parade/Color of Life." The artwork for the single cover features Misia and Mickey Mouse on a gondola covered with flowers, overlooked by the Tokyo DisneySea theme park. The first pressing of the single includes three of nine postcards of Misia at Tokyo DisneySea. The pictures used for the postcards were shot at Mount Prometheus and Mediterranean Harbor, two of the theme park's "port-of-calls."

Misia was a special guest at the Tokyo DisneySea Countdown Event on December 31, 2006, where she performed the theme song for the show-goers.

== Composition ==
"Sea of Dreams"
A 28-second sample of the final chorus of "Sea of Dreams."

"Sea of Dreams" was co-written by Misia and John Kavanaugh, while the composition and production were handled by Kavanaugh. Misia, who is said to be an avid Disney fan, was offered by the Tokyo Disney Resort producers to be the first artist to sing the theme song for the Tokyo DisneySea theme park. The song was written to celebrate the theme park's fifth anniversary and served as its theme song for a duration of ten months, starting July 14, 2006. In a press release, Misia commented, "When I saw the (Tokyo DisneySea) show, I was overcome with energy and tears of happiness. Disney offers entertainment that truly makes people happy and I can relate to that because it is also something I strive for as an artist."

== Chart performance ==
"Sea of Dreams: Tokyo DisneySea 5th Anniversary Theme Song" debuted on the Oricon Daily Singles chart at number 9 and peaked at number 13 on the Oricon Weekly Singles chart, with 16,813 copies sold in its first week. The single charted for nine weeks and sold a total of 30,921 copies.

== Track listing ==
No.	Title	Lyrics	Music	Length
1.	"Sea of Dreams"	Misia, John Kavanaugh	Kavanaugh	4:39

== Charts ==
Chart (2006)	Peak position
Oricon Daily Singles	9
Oricon Weekly Singles	13
SoundScan Japan Weekly Singles	16
