= Shinin' (Nijiiro no Rhythm) =

Single by Misia

from the album Ascension
- Released: November 22, 2005
- Recorded: 2005; Rhythmedia Studio (Tokyo)
- Genre: Pop, house
- Length: 5:12
- Label: Rhythmedia Tribe
- Composer(s): Joi
- Lyricist(s): Misia
- Producer(s): Joi

"Shinin' (Nijiiro no Rhythm)" (SHININ' ～虹色のリズム～, Shinin' ~Nijiiro no Rizumu~, lit. "Shinin' (Rainbow Rhythm)") is a song by Japanese recording artist Misia. It was released as a digital single on November 22, 2005 and was used in Biore by Kao commercials. The song was written by Misia while the composition and production were handled by singer-songwriter Joi. A 12" single including remixes by Joe Claussell was released on December 21, 2005.

== Track listing ==
Digital download
No.	Title	Lyrics	Music	Length
1.	"Shinin' (Nijiiro no Rhythm)" (SHININ' ～虹色のリズム～ Shinin' (Rainbow Rhythm))	Misia	Joi	5:12
