= Toshinobu Kubota discography =

- Studio albums: 19
- Soundtrack albums: 29
- Compilation albums: 11
- Tribute albums: 2
- Singles: 72
- Video albums: 11
- Music videos: 38
- Promotional singles: 11

The discography of Japanese R&B singer Toshinobu Kubota consists of nineteen studio albums, eleven compilation albums, two tribute albums, and over seventy singles. In 1985, Kubota signed with Sony Japan and began producing and writing songs for many of label's singers and groups. Under the label, Kubota released his first single, "Shitsui no Downtown" in June 1986, followed by "Time Shower ni Utarete" in December. Both songs were well received by radio, placing fifty-three and thirty-five on the Oricon Singles Chart. In September 1986, his debut album, Shake It Paradise, peaked at number twenty-two and remained on the Oricon Albums Chart for seven consecutive weeks. Shake It Paradise became certified million. The following year in 1987, Kubota's second studio album, Groovin', debuted at number thirty-three and was certified million. In February 1988, Kubota released "You Were Mine", which debuted at number two. In September 1988, Kubota released his third album, Such A Funky Thang!. The album peaked at number one and was certified million. The album also spawned the top-charted single "Dance If You Want It", which peaked at number three. In 1989, Kubota released his compilation album, The Baddest. The album also peaked at number one and was certified million.

Kubota's fourth studio album, Bonga Wanga, was released in July 1990. The album, like its predecessors, peaked at number one and became certified million. Following the next three years, Kubota released "Kubojah: Parallel World I", "Neptune", and "The Baddest II". In 1994, he relocated to New York in the United States of America and began working on upcoming album. In January 1995, he released seventh album, Bumpin' Voyage. The album spawned the top-five hit "Yoru ni Dakarete (A Night in Afro Blue)".

In September 1995, Kubota released an English version of Bumpin' Voyage, which was titled Sunshine, Moonlight, his eighth album. The album peaked at number one and sold over a half million records worldwide. In May 1996, Kubota released "La La La Love Song." The single became Kubota's first number one hit. The single also became certified million selling over two million copies worldwide. The song was also used as the theme song of Japanese television drama series Long Vacation. In December 1996, the album La La La Love Thang was released. The album peaked at number two and became certified double platinum, selling over 840,00 copies. In following years, Kubota released three non-album singles "Cymbals" (1997), "Ahhhhh!" (1998), and "Soul Bangin'" (1999). In 2000, Kubota released the albums Nothing But Your Love (second English-language album) and As One, which both albums charted in the top ten. In the following years, Kubota went on to release the albums United Flow (2002), Time to Share (his third English-language album) (2004), and For Real? (2006).

After a four-year hiatus, Kubota released his fifteenth album, Timeless Fly in February 2010. The album charted at number nine on the Oricon Albums Chart. In November 2010, Kubota released his sixth compilation album Love & Rain: Love Songs. The lead single "Love Rain (Koi no Ame)" charted at number three on the Oricon Singles chart. Kubota released his sixteenth album, Gold Skool, in August 2011. The album charted at number three, selling over 33,000 copies in its first week of release. Kubota released "The Baddest: Hit Parade" in November 2011, which peaked at number two. As of July 2012, Kubota has sold over twelve million records to date. In March 2015, Kubota released "L.O.K." The album peaked at number three on the Oricon Weekly Albums chart and sold 21,285 copies in its first week of release.

== Albums ==
=== Studio albums ===
Title	Album details	Peak chart positions	Sales (JPN)	Certifications
Shake It Paradise	Released: September 10, 1986; Label: Sony Music Entertainment Japan; Formats: CD, cassette, digital download	22	1,000,000+	RIAJ: Million
Groovin'	Released: April 22, 1987; Label: Sony Music Entertainment Japan; Formats: CD, cassette, digital download	38	1,000,000+	RIAJ: Million
Such A Funky Thang!	Released: September 30, 1988; Label: Sony Music Entertainment Japan; Formats: CD, cassette, digital download	1	1,000,000+	RIAJ: Million
Bonga Wanga	Released: July 15, 1990; Label: Sony Music Entertainment Japan; Formats: CD, cassette, digital download	1	1,000,000+	RIAJ: Million
Kubojah: Parallel World I	Released: September 21, 1991; Label: Sony Music Entertainment Japan; Formats: CD, cassette, digital download	1	570,000+	RIAJ: 2× Platinum
Neptune	Released: July 1, 1992; Label: Sony Music Entertainment Japan; Formats: CD, cassette, digital download	3	484,000+	RIAJ: 2× Platinum
Bumpin' Voyage	Released: January 28, 1995; Label: Sony Music Entertainment Japan; Formats: CD, digital download	1	600,000+	RIAJ: 2× Platinum
Sunshine, Moonlight	Released: September 10, 1995; Label: Columbia Records; Formats: CD, digital download	1	500,000+	RIAJ: 2× Platinum
La La La Love Thang	Released: December 2, 1996; Label: Sony Music Entertainment Japan; Formats: CD, cassette, digital download	2	840,000+	RIAJ: 3× Platinum
Nothing But Your Love	Released: June 28, 2000; Label: Epic Records; Formats: CD, digital download	7	73,000+	
As One	Released: September 27, 2000; Label: Sony Music Entertainment Japan; Formats: CD, digital download	5	148,000+	RIAJ: Gold
United Flow	Released: April 10, 2002; Label: Sony Music Entertainment Japan; Formats: CD, digital download	9	68,000+	
Time to Share	Released: September 15, 2004; Label: Sony Music Entertainment Japan; Formats: CD, digital download	25	24,000+	
For Real?	Released: March 1, 2006; Label: Sony Music Entertainment Japan; Formats: CD, digital download	13	39,000+	
Timeless Fly	Released: February 24, 2010; Label: Sony Music Entertainment Japan, Mastersix Foundation; Formats: CD, digital download	9	16,063+	
Gold Skool	Released: August 3, 2011; Label: Rhythmedia Tribe, Sony Music Entertainment Japan, Mastersix Foundation; Formats: CD, digital download	3	78,124+	
Kubossa: Parallel World II	Released: July 3, 2013; Label: Sony Music Entertainment Japan; Formats: CD, digital download	11	38,160	
L.O.K.	Released: March 18, 2015; Label: Sony Music Entertainment Japan; Formats: CD, digital download	3	43,694	
Beautiful People	Released: November 27, 2019; Label: Sony Music Entertainment Japan; Formats: CD, digital download	7	13,845	

=== Compilation albums ===
Title	Album details	Peak chart positions	Sales (JPN)	Certifications
The Baddest	Released: October 8, 1989; Label: Sony Music Entertainment Japan; Formats: CD, cassette, digital download	1	1,230,000+	RIAJ: Million
Kiss My Thang: Toshinobu Kubota's Selection	Released: December 1, 1990; Label: Sony Music Entertainment Japan; Formats: CD, cassette	—		
The Baddest II	Released: September 23, 1993; Label: Sony Music Entertainment Japan; Formats: CD, cassette, digital download	1	791,000+	RIAJ: 3× Platinum
Toshinobu Kubota Greatest Hits	Released: 1998 (Hong Kong release ony); Label: Sony Music Entertainment Hong Kong; Formats: CD, cassette	—		
The Best of Kubota Toshinobu	Released: 1999 (Taiwan release only); Label: Sony Music Entertainment Taiwan; Formats: CD	—	9,950+	
The Baddest: Only for Lovers in the Mood	Released: July 24, 2002; Label: Sony Music Entertainment Japan; Formats: CD, digital download	28		
The Baddest III	Released: December 4, 2002; Label: Sony Music Entertainment Japan; Formats: CD, digital download	3	316,000+	RIAJ: Platinum
Love & Rain: Love Songs	Released: November 24, 2010; Label: Sony Music Entertainment Japan; Formats: CD, digital download	11	33,870+	
The Baddest: Hit Parade	Released: November 23, 2011; Label: Sony Music Entertainment Japan; Formats: CD, digital download	2	351,049	RIAJ: Platinum
The Baddest IV & Timeless Hits	Released: September 10, 2025; Label: Sony Music Entertainment Japan; Formats: CD, digital download	8	11,753	
The Baddest: Son of R&B	Released: March 11, 2026; Label: Sony Music Entertainment Japan; Formats: CD, digital download	9	5,543	

=== Other albums ===
Title	Album details	Peak chart positions
Soul Tree: A Musical Tribute to Toshinobu Kubota	Released: February 25, 2004; Label: Sony Music Entertainment Japan; Formats: CD, cassette, digital download	9
The World Sings Kubota	Released: August 6, 2008; Label: Sony Music Entertainment Japan; Formats: CD, cassette, digital download	—

== Singles ==
List of singles, with selected chart positions and sales, showing year released and album name.
Title	Year	Oricon Singles Charts	Billboard Japan Hot 100	RIAJ Digital Tracks	Sales (JPN)	Certification	Album
"Shitsui no Downtown" (Downtown Disappointment)	1986	53	—	—	11,350		Shake It Paradise
"Ryuusei no Sadoru" (Saddle of Meteor)	1986	—	—	—			Shake It Paradise
"Missing"	1986	—	—	16	500,000	RIAJ: 2× Platinum	Shake It Paradise
"Randy Candy"	1987	—	—	—			Groovin'
"Psychic Beat"	1987	—	—	—			Groovin'
"Daiyamondo no Inutachi" (Diamond Dogs)	1987	—	—	—			Groovin'
"Kitakaze to Taiyō" (The North Wind and The Sun)	1987	—	—	—			Groovin'
"Eien no Tsubasa" (Wings of Forever)	1987	—	—	—			Groovin'
"Cry On Your Smile"	1987	8	—	—	97,040	RIAJ: Gold	I Want to be Bitten - OST
"Dance If You Want It"	1988	2	—	—	151,630	RIAJ: Gold	Such A Funky Thang!
"You Were Mine"	1988	3	—	—	341,340	RIAJ: Platinum	Arrest Your Eyes - OST
"Indigo Waltz"	1989	—	—	—	102,270	RIAJ: Gold	Such A Funky Thang!
"High Roller"	1989	11	—	—	53,890		Such A Funky Thang!
"Give You My Love"	1989	3	—	—	154,450	RIAJ: Gold	The Baddest
"Oh, What A Night!"	1989	—	—	—			The Baddest
"Be Wanabee"	1990	16	—	—	41,170		Bonga Wanga
"Mama Udongo (In Eyelid)"	1990	—	—	—			Bonga Wanga
"Oh Bora Of Life"	1990	—	—	—			Bonga Wanga
"Honey B"	1991	15	—	—	78,150		Kubojah: Parallel World I
"Keep On Jammin'"	1991	15	—	—	78,150		Kubojah: Parallel World I
"Amaoto" (Sound of Rain)	1991	34	—	—	39,370		Kubojah: Parallel World I
"Love Like A Rastaman"	1991	—	—	—			Kubojah: Parallel World I
"Mayonaka No Taiyou" (Midnight Sun)	1992	—	—	—			Neptune
"Let's Get A Groove ~Yo!Hips~"	1992	—	—	—			Neptune
"Yume with You" (Dream with You)	1993	5	—	—	344,270	RIAJ: Platinum	The Baddest II
"Orquesta Futari"	1993	13	—	—	140,820	RIAJ: Gold	The Baddest II
"Yoru ni Dakarete (A Night in Afro Blue)" (Being Held in the Evening (A Night In Afro Blue))	1994	5	—	—	320,170	RIAJ: Platinum	Bumpin' Voyage
"Za-Ku-Za-Ku Digame"	1994	17	—	—	61,210		Bumpin' Voyage
"Sunshine, Moonlight"	1994	—	—	—	61,210		Bumpin' Voyage
"Niji no Grand Slam" (Grand Slam of the Rainbow)	1995	15	—	—	121,270	RIAJ: Gold	La La La Love Thang
"Funk It Up"	1995	91	—	—	2,930		Sunshine, Moonlight
"La La La Love Song" (featuring Naomi Campbell)	1996	1	73	62	2,000,000	RIAJ: 2x Million	La La La Love Thang
"Just the Two of Us" (featuring Caron Wheeler)	1996	30	—	—	42,140		Sunshine, Moonlight
"Body-Cation"	1996	12	—	—	84,990		La La La Love Thang
"Cymbals"	1997	19	—	38	148,730	RIAJ: Gold	Kimi ga Jinsei no Toki - OST
"Ahhhhh!"	1998	5	—	—	265,140	RIAJ: Platinum	Radio Boy! Bran Go - OST
"Sound of Carnival"	1999	9	—	—	97,110	RIAJ: Gold	As One
"Messengers' Rhyme (Rakushow, It's your Show!)" (featuring Naomi Shimizu)	1999	9	—	—	73,530		Messengers - OST
"Nothing But Your Love"	2000	97	—	—	2,390		Nothing But Your Love
"Polyrhythm"	2000	22	—	—	28,730		As One
"Always Remain"	2000	66	—	—	3,110		As One
"Masquerade"	2001	—	—	—			Nothing But Your Love
"Candy Rain"	2001	19	—	—	47,860		United Flow
"Respect (This & That)"	2002	49	—	—	7,520		United Flow
"Breaking Through"	2004	—	—	—			Time to Share
"Shadows of Your Love"	2004	—	—	—			Time to Share
"A Love Story"	2005	43	—	—	18,152		For Real?
"Club Happiness"	2005	40	—	—	8,335		For Real?
"Kimi no Soba ni" (Beside You)	2005	25	—	—	13,203		For Real?
"M☆A☆G☆I☆C" (featuring Kreva)	2007	20	—	—	10,538		Timeless Fly
"Flying Easy Loving Crazy" (featuring Misia)	2008	18	26	—	10,324		Timeless Fly
"Tomorrow Waltz"	2010	36	43	—	4,285		Timeless Fly
"Star Light"	2010	—	—	—			Timeless Fly
"Love Rain (Koi no Ame)" (Love Rain (Rain of Love))	2010	3	5	1	500,000	RIAJ: 2× Platinum	Love & Rain: Love Songs
"Nagareboshi to Koi no Ame" (Rain of love with shooting star)	2011	24	7	—	4,486		Gold Skool
"Koe ni Dekinai" (I Can Not Put Into Words)	2011	20	23	25	5,432		Gold Skool
"Bring me up!"	2013	32	27	—			Bring me up! - Single
"My Cherie Amour"	2013	—	—	—			Kubossa: Parallel World II
"Upside Down"	2014	22	27	—			L.O.K.
"Free Style"	2014	22	—	—			L.O.K.
"Loving Power"	2015	—	32	—			L.O.K.
"—" denotes missing information.

=== As featured artist ===
List of singles, with selected chart positions and sales, showing year released and album name.
Title	Year	Oricon Singles Charts	Billboard Japan Hot 100	RIAJ Digital Tracks	Sales (JPN)	Certification	Album
"Our Song" (Funkahips Allstars featuring Toshinobu Kubota)	1990	—	—	—			Our Song
"Keep Holding U" (SunMin duet with Toshinobu Kubota)	2006	16	—	—	49,734		Nihon Chinbotsu - OST / Brand New Girl
"—" denotes items which were not released in that country or failed to chart.

=== Promotional singles ===
List of singles, with selected chart positions and sales, showing year released and album name.
Title	Year	Oricon Singles Charts	Billboard Japan Hot 100	RIAJ Digital Tracks	Sales (JPN)	Certification	Album
"Time (Shower ni Utarete)"	1986	35	—	—	44,840		Non-album single
"Goddess (Atrashii Megami)"	1987	21	—	—	51,300		Non-album single
"Forever Yours" (featuring Alyson Williams)	1991	18	—	—	44,560		Non-album single
"Soul Bangin'"	1999	25	—	—	33,070		Non-album single
"Soul Bangin' (Remix 1)"	1999	—	—	—	—		Non-album single
"Soul Bangin' (Remix 2)"	1999	—	—	—	—		Non-album single
"Our Christmas"	2003	10	—	—	10,196		Non-album single
"Living for Today" (featuring Mos Def)	2004	—	—	—			Time to Share
"Hold Me Down" (featuring Angie Stone)	2004	—	—	—			Time to Share
"Ooh Wee Rida"	2008	—	—	—			Non-album single
"Golden Smile" (featuring Exile)	2011	—	—	1			Gold Skool
"—" denotes items which were not released in that country or failed to chart.

== Soundtrack appearances ==
Year	Title	Soundtrack
1987	"Cry On Your Smile"	I Want to be Bitten
1989	"You Were Mine"	Arrest Your Eyes
1989	"Moving Target"	Aitsu Ga Trouble
1990	"Be Wanabee"	Sekai Fushigi Hakken
1990	"Mama Udongo (In Eyelid)"	Forest News
1993	"Yume with You"	Chance!
1994	"Yoru ni Dakarete (A Night in Afro Blue)"	Yoru ni Dakarete
1995	"Niji no Grand Slam"	H2
1996	"La La La Love Song"	Long Vacation
1997	"Cymbals"	Kimi ga Jinsei no Toki
1998	"Ahhhhh!"	Radio Boy! Bran Go
1999	"The Sound of Carnival"	Dokushin Seikatsu
1999	"Messengers' Rhyme: Rakushow, It's Your Show!" (featuring Naomi Shimizu)	Messengers
1999	"No Lights ... Candle Light"	Messengers
2000	"Always Remain"	Passion Rogue Detective
2000	"Polyrhythm"	Sydney Olympic
2001	"Candy Rain"	Suiyoubi no Jouji
2003	"Free Your Soul"	Ai no Karada
2004	"A Love Story"	Shall we Dance?
2005	"Sign of Love"	Isamu Noguchi Exhibition
2005	"Club Happiness"	Kikujiro and Saki
2005	"Beside You"	Under The Same Moon
2005	"Rock wit me Poh!"	Ninety - nine round
2006	"Keep Holding U" (duet with SunMin)	Nihon Chinbotsu
2010	"Tomorrow Waltz"	No Tomorrow
2010	"Love Rain (Koi no Ame)"	Tsuki no Koibito ~Moon Lovers~
2010	"Life Long High Way"	Kenmin Show: Coming Out the Local Seacrets!
2011	"Nagareboshi to Koi no Ame"	Refreshing
2011	"Koe ni Dekinai"	Yoake no Machi de

== Production credits ==
Year	Title	Artist	Album
1985	"Oh Daddy"	Moated Mound	n/a
1985	"Cool Shake the raw"	Toshihiko Tahara	Don't Disturb
1985	"Show me the tears Darling"	Toshihiko Tahara	Don't Disturb
1985	"Trump only once"	Toshihiko Tahara	Don't Disturb
1985	"Shotgun"	Toshihiko Tahara	The Thomas Crown Affair
1985	"The Thomas Crown Affair"	Toshihiko Tahara	The Thomas Crown Affair
1985	"Cry Out High"	Toshihiko Tahara	n/a
1985	"Oh Killer Lady"	Toshihiko Tahara	n/a
1985	"Moonlight"	Hiromi Iwasaki	Moonlight
1985	"Until the end of the winter"	Maiko Okamoto	Sofia in November
1985	"Friday The 13th"	Risa Yamamoto	Summer in November
1985	"Goodbye to slow dance"	Morio Kazama	Lonely
1985	"It's Bad"	Toshihiko Tahara	It's Bad
1985	"From Venice in February"	Judy Ong	Dream of Utakata
1985	"No More Trick"	Kenji Haga	n/a
1985	"Distant travelers"	Toshihiko Tahara	Aesthetics heartbreak
1985	"Wings of dream"	Toshihiko Tahara	Aesthetics heartbreak
1986	"Fire Starter"	Etsuko Aya	Delication
1986	"Eye clean Lover Man"	Etsuko Aya	Delication
1986	"Nudist"	Kyoko Koizumi	Beautiful and pure fun of Kyoko
1986	"In front of the church"	Kyoko Koizumi	Beautiful and pure fun of Kyoko
1986	"Leave flutter"	Masayuki Suzuki	Mother of Pearl
1986	"Can not become the only one tonight"	Masayuki Suzuki	Mother of Pearl
1986	"Scandal rainbow colors"	Noriko Matsumoto	Scandal rainbow colors
1986	"Lazy Dance"	Yōko Oginome	Raspberry Wind
1986	"Paradise stylish"	Risa Yamamoto	You're In
1986	"Do not cry now (bullying the) II"	Kayoko Matsunaga	Universe fine girl
1986	"La Lover"	Maiko Okamoto	fascination
1986	"Let Us in the Youth, Pt. I"	Kyoko Koizumi	Liar
1986	"Black Out the smell of love"	Risa south	Black Out the smell of love
1986	"Morning Moon of Eternal"	Etsuko Sai	Passio
1986	"Long Good-bye in the Kiss"	Haruko Sagara	Bitter Kiss
1986	"Time Out"	Anri	Trouble in Paradise
1986	"Love transceiver"	Naoko Isamu	The angels of the asphalt
1986	"The pain of the boy (Don't Go)"	Naoko Isamu	The angels of the asphalt
1986	"Leave me alone (Night-Endless)"	Noritake Kinashi (featuring Tunnels)	First Canyon
1987	"Vanity Night"	Miyoko Yoshimoto	Vanity Night
1987	"Dream"	Kippurenon	Boom Boom Party
1987	"G · L · A · N · C · E"	Taizo Koshiba	Dear
1987	"Puritan (Amish)"	Akina Nakamori	Blonde
1987	"By-By My Sea Breeze"	Miho Nakayama	One and Only
1987	"Singapore"	Miho Nakayama	One and Only
1987	"Real Time"	Miyoko Yoshimoto	I'm the One
1987	"Nowhere Without You"	Marine	This Time
1987	"All or Nothing"	Tunnels	Kawaguchiko
1988	"Fly Free"	Project C	n/a
1988	"Moon Light"	Kyoko Koizumi	Beat Pop - Koizumi Kyoko Super Session
1988	"Party"	Kyoko Koizumi	Beat Pop - Koizumi Kyoko Super Session
1988	"Sand and diamonds"	Amazons	Fake heaven
1988	"Growin' Up"	Gwinko	Teenage Beat
1988	"In the Morning"	Miho Nakayama	Mind Game / Mermaid Little Mermaid
1988	"Take It Easy"	Miho Nakayama	Mind Game
1988	"Velvet Hammer"	Miho Nakayama	Mind Game
1989	"Do You Wanna Kiss?"	Toshihiko Tahara	Tokyo Beat
1989	"City of night"	Toshihiko Tahara	Tokyo Beat
1990	"Once I Was"	Kenia	n/a
1990	"Boogie Woogie Dance"	Funkahips All Stars	Our Song
1990	"Our Song"	Funkahips All Stars	Our Song
1990	"Take Your Time"	Funkahips All Stars	n/a
1991	"Us"	Gwinko	Us
1991	"Bijo to Yajū"	Yōko Oginome	Trust Me
1991	"In the Joy"	Koji Morita	Heart Touch
1991	"Morning Rain"	Yōko Oginome	New Take: Best Collections '92
1992	"Stripper Lady"	Meyou	Stripper Lady
1992	"For My Dear"	Mie Shimizu	Magic
1992	"Magic"	Mie Shimizu	Magic
1992	"Beautiful Play"	Mariko Takahash	Lady Coast
1992	"Boys"	Mie Shimizu	Camellia Flower
1992	"Heaven"	Mie Shimizu	Camellia Flower
1992	"Garuru"	Mie Shimizu	Camellia Flower
1992	"Camellia flower"	Mie Shimizu	Camellia Flower
1992	"Do not stop the heart of Dance"	Mie Shimizu	Camellia Flower
1992	"Vacation Hot Lovin'"	ASAP	Vacation Hot Lovin'
1992	"One Heart to Love"	Yoko Takahashi	Pizzicato
1993	"Love Crisis"	Masatoshi Nakamura	You give a Lovesong
1993	"Magic in Kobe"	ASAP	Magic in Kobe
1993	"Hang Out!"	Hiroshi Mikami	Hang Out!
1993	"Love Train Hashire"	Rie Miyazawa	Rosee
1993	"One day I became a bird"	Toshihiko Tahara	More Electric
1993	"Eternal identity"	Toshihiko Tahara	More Electric
1993	"In my thoughts in the light"	Mariko Takahashi	Verse
1994	"For example, much more"	Akiko Matsumoto	For example, much more
1994	"Got My Lovin'"	George Willow	Storage
1994	"Addicted to love"	Brother Tom	Funkastic Oyage
1994	"Candle light"	Brother Tom	Many Merry Christmas
1994	"Many Merry Christmas"	Brother Tom	Many Merry Christmas
1995	"Cheers for You"	Miho Nakayama	Cheers for You
1995	"Big Wave"	Kanzaki (featuring Maki)	Sweet Vibration
1996	"Thank you courage"	Tokio	Thank you courage
1996	"Private Eyes"	Emiri Nakayama	Private Eyes
1997	"Mint Mind"	Luv 2 Shy	Mint Mind
1997	"Heat Up"	Ken Hirai	Heat Up
1997	"Love is Changing"	Hikaru Nishada	Why do they do so? Oh Really Love is Changing
1997	"Why do they do so? Oh Really"	Hikaru Nishada	Why do they do so? Oh Really Love is Changing
1997	"Hammer of temptation"	Delicious Hip	Hammer of temptation
1998	"Umi made 5-fun"	Chisato Moritaka	Sava Sava
1998	"I've never felt this way Harihari helicopter helicopter"	Sayaka Yoshino with Nansho Boppers	I've never felt this way Harihari helicopter helicopter
1998	"I call your name"	Di-Va	Viva! Diva
2000	"I'll never forget you"	Aira	I'll never forget you
2000	"Unfit in Love"	Ken Hirai	The Changing Same
2001	"Vibe, Survive"	8/15	Vibe, Survive
2001	"solo soul"	Toshinori Yonekura	gift
2002	"Which Way"	Yoichiro Kakizaki	Dog Soul K
2003	"Funky Party"	KinKi Kids	Eternal Bloods
2003	"Shape of Love"	ISSA	Extension
2003	"Thank you"	Real Blood	± 0
2004	"Holy Hold Me"	Misia	Singer for Singer
2004	"Let It Smile"	Misia	Singer for Singer
2005	"Monologue"	Chemistry	Hot Chemistry
2006	"Keep Holding U"	SunMin & Toshinobu Kubota	Keep Holding U
2006	"(History of Love) Et Encore"	Amazons	Amazons
2007	"Fiesta! Fiesta!"	Yamada Yuu	Myusic
2008	"Style"	SMAP	super.modern.artistic.performance
2009	"Squeaking Softly"	SMAP	Squeaking Softly / Super Star
2010	"We are SMAP! - Funky lude" / "We are SMAP! - Bounce Lude"	SMAP	We are SMAP!
2011	"Next to you"	May J.	Colors
2011	"Love"	Tackey & Tsubasa	Trip & Treasure

== Videos ==
=== Video albums ===
Title	Album details	Peak chart positions
Super Duper Vol. 1	Released: May 5, 1988; Label: Sony Japan; Formats: VHS, 8mm video	—
Keep on Dancing	Released: July 2, 1988; Label: Sony Japan; Formats: VHS	—
Super Duper Vol. 2	Released: December 1, 1990; Label: Sony Japan; Formats: VHS, 8mm video	—
Nihonichi no Bonga Wanga Otokos Tour '91 (Bonga Wanga Spring Tour 1991)	Released: July 1, 1991; Label: Sony Japan; Formats: VHS	—
Super Duper Vol. 3	Released: March 1, 1992; Label: Sony Japan; Formats: VHS	—
Super Duper Vol. 4	Released: January 28, 1995; Label: Sony Japan; Formats: VHS	—
Super Duper Vol. 5 from New York	Released: December 2, 1996; Label: Sony Japan; Formats: VHS	—
Toshinobu Kubota Concert Tour '96 Oyeees!	Released: March 1, 1997; Label: Sony Japan; Formats: VHS, DVD	—
Super Duper Vol. 6	Released: October 18, 2000; Label: Sony Japan; Formats: VHS, DVD	—
Super Duper Vol. 7 The Baddest on Films	Released: May 8, 2003; Label: Sony Japan; Formats: DVD	67
Live 2006 "We For Real?"	Released: August 8, 2006; Label: Sony Japan; Formats: DVD	42
Timeless Fly DVD	Released: February 24, 2010; Label: Sony Japan; Formats: DVD	—
Love & Rain: Love Songs DVD	Released: November 24, 2010; Label: Sony Japan; Formats: DVD	—
Gold Skool DVD	Released: August 3, 2011; Label: Sony Japan; Formats: DVD	—
The Baddest: Hit Parade DVD	Released: August 3, 2011; Label: Sony Japan; Formats: DVD	—
Party Ain't A Party	Released: May 30, 2012; Label: Sony Japan; Formats: Blu-ray, DVD	5
In the Universe	Released: June 18, 2014; Label: Sony Japan; Formats: Blu-ray, DVD	—
