= The Baddest =

Baddest or The Baddest may refer to:

== Albums ==
- Baddest (album), a 1981 album by Grover Washington Jr.
- The Baddest (Toshinobu Kubota album), 1989
- The Baddest II, a 1989 album by Toshinobu Kubota
- The Baddest III, a 2002 album by Toshinobu Kubota
- The Baddest: Only for Lovers in the Mood, a 2002 album by Toshinobu Kubota
- The Baddest: Hit Parade, a 2011 album by Toshinobu Kubota
- The Baddest, album by Dave Graney & The Coral Snakes 1999

== Songs ==
- "Baddest" (Yung Bleu, Chris Brown, and 2 Chainz song), 2021
- Baddest (Imanbek and Cher Lloyd song), 2021
- "The Baddest" (Froggy Fresh song), 2012
- "The Baddest" (K/DA song), 2020
- "The Baddest" (BGYO song), 2021
- "Baddest", a song by AKA, 2016
- "The Baddest", a song by Joey Badass from 2000, 2022
