= Lisa Ellis =

Lisa Ellis may refer to:

- Lisa Ellis (martial artist) (born 1982), American mixed martial artist
- Lisa Ellis (American politician) (born 1975), American educator and politician
- Lisa Ellis (political scientist), New Zealand political scientist
- Lisa Ellis (executive producer) (born 1970), American businessperson and financier
