= I Have Nothing =

1993 single by Whitney Houston

Single by Whitney Houston

from the album The Bodyguard
- B-side: "All the Man That I Need"; "Where You Are"; "Lover for Life"
- Released: February 20, 1993
- Recorded: November 12, 1991
- Studio: Encore Studios, Los Angeles, California
- Genre: R&B; pop; soul
- Length: 4:48
- Label: Arista
- Songwriters: David Foster; Linda Thompson
- Producer: David Foster

Whitney Houston singles chronology
"I'm Every Woman" (1993)	"I Have Nothing" (1993)	"Run to You" (1993)

Music video
- "I Have Nothing" on YouTube

"I Have Nothing" is a song by American singer and actress Whitney Houston, released on February 20, 1993, as the third single from The Bodyguard (1992) by Arista Records. The power ballad was written by David Foster and Linda Thompson, and produced by Foster.

The song was lyrically inspired by Thompson's earlier relationship with American rock singer Elvis Presley while musically, Foster was inspired by the music of Janis Joplin to compose the song. It was one of the first songs to be recorded for the soundtrack to The Bodyguard and was performed in the film itself.

The song became an instant hit following its release, peaking at number four on the US Billboard Hot 100, number one on the US Cash Box Top 100 and was certified quadruple platinum by the Recording Industry Association of America. The song also became a hit on the Billboard Hot R&B Singles chart, with a number four peak, and number-one peaks on the Billboard Adult Contemporary chart and Radio Songs chart.

Houston established another historic chart milestone in Billboard when the track joined the aforementioned previous two Bodyguard songs simultaneously in the top 11, making her the first artist to have three songs inside the top 20 of the Hot 100 chart in the same week since the chart began using Broadcast Data System and SoundScan data in 1991.

Internationally, the song reached number one in Canada, the top five in Ireland and the United Kingdom, the top ten in Denmark and Portugal, and peaked within the top forty in Australia, Germany, the Netherlands, New Zealand, and Switzerland. The song sold over 12 million copies worldwide and received various nominations, including for the Academy Award for Best Original Song, Grammy Award for Best Song Written for Visual Media, and Soul Train Music Award for Best R&B Single (Female).

The song was promoted by Houston with live performances on her worldwide concert tour, The Bodyguard World Tour (1993–94) only, and also at various awards ceremonies and concerts such as the 4th Billboard Music Awards in 1993, the 21st American Music Awards in 1994, Whitney: The Concert for a New South Africa in 1994, and the 1st BET Awards in 2001. "I Have Nothing" also features on compilations like Whitney: The Greatest Hits (2000), I Will Always Love You: The Best of Whitney Houston (2012) and Whitney Houston Live: Her Greatest Performances (2014).

As with much of Houston's material, the song has been an extremely popular choice on many reality television series around the world, in particular American Idol, on which it has become the most performed song in the show's history; as of 2026, it had been covered fourteen times. "I Have Nothing" was also featured on the second half of the trailer, for the estate-approved documentary on Houston's life, Whitney. The power ballad is cited as one of Houston's signature songs.

As of September 2026, the music video for "I Have Nothing" has over 1 billion views on YouTube, making Houston the first artist to have two 1990s music videos to reach the milestone, along with "I Will Always Love You". The video for "I Have Nothing" is one of the most watched videos of all time.

== Background and recording ==
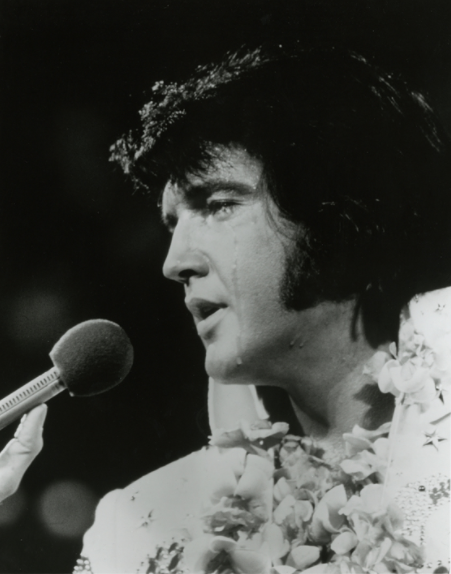
The lyrics in the song were inspired by Linda Thompson's romance with American singer Elvis Presley.

In April 1991, Houston announced that she was to begin filming her first movie, The Bodyguard, with Kevin Costner as co-star. After her I'm Your Baby Tonight World Tour wrapped up in October of the year, producers of the film — including Costner himself — set the date for principal photography on November 25, 1991. Initially, the romance thriller featured no music, which concerned Houston's label head, Clive Davis, who sent a letter to Costner and the film's director Mick Jackson, addressing them of how Houston's character, singing diva Rachel Marron, needed a bodyguard with minimal music. Costner agreed with Davis' concern and, through Warner Bros. Pictures, Houston eventually signed a deal to record content for the film's soundtrack in which she would earn royalties. Houston, along with Davis, would serve as executive producer on the album.

Houston agreed to record six songs, of which, five would be prominently featured in scenes from the film that would then feature Houston's character performing the songs. After recording her composition, the hard rock number "Queen of the Night" with producers Kenneth "Babyface" Edmonds and Antonio "L.A." Reid on November 9, 1991; Houston headed to Encore Studios in Burbank, California three days later on November 12 to begin working with record producer David Foster on "I Have Nothing", the first of three songs Foster and Houston worked on together.

According to the producer, who was handpicked by Houston and Kevin Costner to be one of the producers on the soundtrack, the singer didn't need any vocal warmup after going over the song, though she initially was concerned about the song's pitch, complaining to Foster that she "couldn't hit the note" and asked if he could drop the pitch down to a lower key. However, Foster told her he wouldn't be able to change the pitch, due to the fact that keyboards at the time didn't have chord progression edits. Afterwards, Houston reportedly sipped green herbal tea before laying down her vocal.

According to Jordin Sparks, while her and Houston worked on the film Sparkle, Houston explained to her that she was "six months pregnant" at the time of the recording and just recorded three takes of the song. Foster was inspired by Janis Joplin's "Piece of My Heart" to compose the song.

The song was lyrically composed by Foster's then-wife Linda Thompson. In her 2016 memoirs, A Little Thing Called Life: On Loving Elvis Presley, Bruce Jenner, and Songs in Between, Thompson mentions that Jackson had approached her to write a song for The Bodyguard. She later revealed that the lyrics, "Stay in my arms if you dare / Or must I imagine you there / Don't walk away from me", was inspired by her relationship with American singer Elvis Presley. Thompson was Presley's girlfriend between 1972 and 1976; Thompson broke up with the star prior to his death a year later. Said Thompson, "having lived with the very biggest male diva of all time, I had a good deal of experience to draw on while creating that lyric." Thompson further wrote about the character of Marron in the film, "it was centered around this gorgeous megastar. She's petulant. She's a diva. And she has this bodyguard, he's protecting her, but she's difficult. And then she starts to fall in love with him. And the song has to be called 'I Have Nothing.'" Much like "I Will Always Love You", Houston performed the song in the film and later the music video of the song at the Fontainebleau in Miami Beach.

=== Composition ===
According to the sheet music published by Warner Chappell Music, "I Have Nothing" is a pop and R&B song with soul elements.

Written in ternary form with a "moderately slow" tempo of 52 beats per minute, the song is initially set in the key of G major. The verse follows a G—Em7—C—Bm7—Am7—C/D chord progression, where the final chord is occasionally substituted with Am7/D to highlight the song's soul music influences. The bridge shifts to the relative minor key of E minor, while the first two choruses modulate to the parallel minor of G minor. The chorus opens on D_{5} (the major seventh of the underlying E♭ major chord, which serves as the VI degree of the G minor scale), this creates a harmonic instability that is further emphasized by a harmonic rhythm of two beats per chord. Led by a vocal peak, the final chorus modulates to G# minor, before ultimately releasing tension by shifting to its relative major, B major.

Houston's vocal range in the song goes from the low note of G_{3} to the high note of F♯_{5} while the piano range from producer David Foster goes from as low as C_{2} to a high F♯_{5}.

== Critical reception ==
Stephen Thomas Erlewine from AllMusic complimented the song as a "first-rate urban pop song that skillfully captures Houston at her best". Larry Flick from Billboard magazine called it a "booming power ballad". He added that it "has the same lung-bursting drama" as "I Will Always Love You", "tweaked with a quasi-symphonic climax that never fails to push all the right buttons. No need to predict single's future. Just count the minutes to its planting at No. 1." Another Billboard editor, Chuck Taylor, in his writing about Britney Spears on October 24, 1998, issue, described "I Have Nothing" as "bombastic and ultra-challenging." Jan DeKnock of Chicago Tribune said it is "yet another scorcher of a ballad" from the soundtrack. Dave Sholin from the Gavin Report complimented Houston's "emotionally-charged performance". In his weekly UK chart commentary, James Masterton wrote, "A classic ballad like the Whitney we used to know and love showing her voice off to best effect and making a deservedly high new entry."

Howard Cohen from The Miami Herald remarked that Houston "soars effortlessly as she belts out the brass-inflected ballad". James Montgomery of MTV said the song was "untouchable." Alan Jones from Music Week declared it as "an emotionally charged rollercoaster of a song, giving Ms Houston another chance to display her range." Nancy Culp from NME felt the "big ballad epic-ness" of "I Have Nothing" "calls for that kind of treatment." Stephen Holden of The New York Times wrote that the song and "Run to You" are "booming generic ballads to which Houston applies her typical stentorian delivery." James T. Jones IV of USA Today praised the song with "Run to You" as "thrilling ballads, powered by an operatic coloratura alto."

== Commercial performance ==
"I Have Nothing" was released as the third single from The Bodyguard in February 1993. The single debuted at number 42 on the US Billboard Hot 100 Singles chart as the Hot Shot Debut of the week, the issue date of February 27, 1993, when her two songs, "I Will Always Love You" and "I'm Every Woman" still placed within the top ten. Remarkably, for the weeks on the Billboard Hot 100 chart ending March 13 and 20, Houston had three songs inside the top 11, making her the first artist to achieve the trifecta on the same week since the Hot 100 began using Broadcast Data System and SoundScan data in 1991. On the Hot 100 Airplay chart, Houston equaled the feat with the aforementioned tracks on the February 27 and March 6 issues. The song peaked at number four on the Hot 100 on the April 3 issue, becoming Houston's 14th top five hit, spending 20 weeks on the chart. The single entered the Billboard Hot R&B Singles chart at number 37 on the February 27 issue and peaked at number four on the chart in the April 10 issue. The song reached number one on the Billboard Hot Adult Contemporary chart the issue dated May 1, 1993, and remained there for two weeks, becoming her tenth number-one song on the chart. It placed at number thirty, thirty-two and seventeen on the Billboard Year-End Hot 100, Hot R&B Singles and Adult Contemporary charts respectively. On the Cash Box pop singles charts, the song peaked at number one on the week of April 10, 1993 and would remain at number one for three consecutive weeks, becoming Houston's eleventh number one single on the chart and her twelfth overall number one hit in the United States. On Cash Box's R&B chart, it peaked at number two behind Silk's "Freak Me" on the week of April 24, 1993.

The single was certified gold for shipments of 500,000 copies or more by the Recording Industry Association of America on June 1, 1993. On March 11, 2019, it was certified platinum for shipments of one million copies or more by the Recording Industry Association of America and then, two years later, on what would've been Houston's 58th birthday, the song was certified double-platinum for sales of two million copies or more. On June 25, 2025, the song was certified quadruple-platinum for sales of four million, becoming Houston's third highest-certified single in the United States after "I Wanna Dance with Somebody (Who Loves Me)" and "I Will Always Love You".

In Canada, the song debuted at number 50 on the RPM Top 100 Hit Tracks chart on March 13, 1993, and four weeks later reached the top ten. In its eighth week of release, on May 1, 1993, the single topped the chart, replacing "If I Ever Lose My Faith in You" by Sting, and spent three weeks at the summit, staying on the chart for 18 weeks. The song entered the RPM Adult Contemporary Tracks chart at number 20 in the same week of its top 100 debut. Within five weeks, it hit the pole position of the chart on April 17, 1993, and stayed on the top for six weeks.

Worldwide, the song was also a success. In the United Kingdom, the single debuted at number nine on the UK Singles Chart on April 24, 1993, and the following week peaked at number three on the chart, making it Houston's ninth UK top five hit. According to The Official Charts Company in 2012, the single had sold 220,000 copies in the country; it has since been certified 2x platinum with sales of over 1.2 million units. It peaked at number four in Ireland, number 16 in Belgium, and number 20 in New Zealand. The song also reached a peak of number 28 in Australia, number 50 in France, number 39 in Germany, number 22 in the Netherlands, and number 39 in Switzerland. Due to the ballad's success in Europe, it peaked at number 9 on the Eurochart Hot 100, following "I Will Always Love You" and "I'm Every Woman". Following Houston's death in 2012, the song re-entered the global charts. In France, it hit a new peak of number 29, outperforming its original 1993 peak while also reaching the Spanish charts for the first time where it peaked at number 23. It also reached the charts in South Korea, peaking at its Circle International singles chart at number 27.

== Music video ==
A music video was produced to promote the single, directed by S. A. Baron. Because Houston was pregnant at the time of the song's release, footage of Houston performing the song to an audience in a dining room hall was shown. The video is intercut with scenes from the film (The Bodyguard, the same thing for I Will Always Love You).

The music video premiered in March 1993 and, like her previous music videos from The Bodyguard, immediately gained heavy rotation on MTV on March 20 of that year. It eventually reached heavy rotation on VH1, BET and other music video stations as well.

The Cleopatra-inspired beaded headpiece and jewelry and black halter gown Houston wears in the main performance scene, shot at the Fontainebleau in Miami Beach, were designed for the singer by the film's costume designer Susan Nininger. The look was included in the list of Harper's Bazaar's "60 Most Iconic Movie Dresses of All Time" in 2025.

It was made available on Houston's official YouTube channel in November 2009, and has generated more than a billion views, hitting the milestone in February 2026, becoming her second music video to do so after the video to "I Will Always Love You". It is her second most popular music video on YouTube.

== Live performances ==
Houston performing a medley of songs including "I Have Nothing" at the 21st American Music Awards on February 7, 1994.

Houston performed "I Have Nothing" at the 4th Billboard Music Awards on December 9, 1993, receiving a standing ovation. Chris Willman of Los Angeles Times commented on the performance, saying "Houston's physically stationary, vocally mobile approach to the ballad―backlit behind the mike in a she-got-back-her-figure-flattering gown―effectively heightened the tune's diva dramaturgy, making it an easy highlight in a night otherwise short on compelling performances." The performance made two retrospective Billboard best-of lists, ranking 81st and 2nd places respectively on their "100 Greatest Award Show Performances of All Time" and "15 Greatest Billboard Music Awards Performances" lists. She also performed a rousing 10-minute-medley of show tunes that ended with the song―"I Loves You, Porgy" from Porgy and Bess, "And I Am Telling You I'm Not Going" from Dreamgirls, and "I Have Nothing"―at the 21st Annual American Music Awards, where she won the record eight awards, on February 7, 1994. This performance was included in the 2014 CD/DVD release, Whitney Houston Live: Her Greatest Performances. Jet magazine wrote about the AMA performance that "she [Houston] brought the house down with her soulful, stirring medley renditions."

On November 12, 1994, Houston sang the song during the concert in Johannesburg, South Africa, entitled Whitney: The Concert for a New South Africa, telecast live via satellite on HBO. The performance is found in VHS and DVD with the same title of the concert, originally released in December 1994, and later re-released on June 24, 2010. The song was also performed on the concert to celebrate the wedding of Brunei royalty, at the Jerudong Park Garden on August 24, 1996. Houston sang the short-edited version of the song along with "I Will Always Love You," which were followed by a standing ovation, at the 1st BET Awards on June 19, 2001, becoming the first artist ever to be given the Lifetime Achievement Award. Houston last performed the ballad briefly during her Nothing but Love World Tour in 2010, singing to and with a fan in the audience during an intermission.

Though "I Have Nothing" is one of Houston's notable hits during her career, the song was performed solely on The Bodyguard World Tour (1993–94) among her ten tours. Houston performed the song as the final part of a medley which included the aforementioned songs from Broadway shows on first North American leg of the tour in 1993, but since the European leg in 1993, the song was performed solely without two show tunes on almost all the rest of the tour dates. Four performances of the song on the South American leg of the tour (1994) were broadcast on each country's TV channel: Rio de Janeiro, Brazil on January 23, Santiago, Chile on April 14, Buenos Aires, Argentina on April 16, and Caracas, Venezuela on April 21.

== Legacy ==
=== Accolades and achievements ===
"I Have Nothing" was nominated for Best Original Song at the 65th Annual Academy Awards on March 29, 1993. David Foster and Linda Thompson were nominated for Best Song Written Specifically for a Motion Picture, Television or Other Visual Media for the song at the 36th Annual Grammy Awards on March 1, 1994.

The song was also nominated for Best R&B Single, Female but lost to Toni Braxton's "Breathe Again" at the 8th Annual Soul Train Music Awards on March 15, 1994.

Foster and Thompson received the award for Most Performed Song from a Film for the song at the 10th BMI Film & Television Awards on May 17, 1994.

=== Polls and rankings ===
In August 2012, Polish Porcys included "I Have Nothing" in their list of "100 Singles 1990-1999". That same year, Rolling Stone readers picked the song as the fourth best Whitney Houston song of all time. Rod Couch ranked the rendition the 234th greatest song of the rock era, the fifth-ranked song out of six Houston songs on Couch's book, The Top 500 Songs of the Rock Era 1955-2015. In 2017, ShortList's Dave Fawbert listed the song as containing "one of the greatest key changes in music history". In 2018, Smooth Radio placed the song in their list of the 19 greatest power ballads of all time. In April 2019, Business Insider included the power ballad in its list of the "Best Songs From the '90s". In November 2020, the day before Houston was formally inducted into the Rock and Roll Hall of Fame, Billboard ranked it the second best Whitney Houston song out of 25 Houston songs.

In his list of twelve favorite Houston songs, Rob Sheffield of Rolling Stone listed "I Have Nothing", writing "after years of being the pop singer with the soul voice, Whitney suddenly turned into a great soul singer", further explaining "the Nineties were Whitney's prime because she evoked adult misery with so much warmth and strength – in 'I Have Nothing,' she sounded fully committed to every line, which would have been unthinkable a few years before."

In 2022, The Guardian ranked it number one in their list of Houston's greatest songs, writing that besides it being overshadowed by the commercial success of "I Will Always Love You" that it was "the Whitney Houston power ballad to end all Whitney Houston power ballads, a five-minute-long emotional rollercoaster ride that surges from gentle pleading to full-on hell-hath-no-fury anger... with all the vocal trimmings thrown in", further adding, "in lesser hands [the song] would just sound histrionic, but Houston's vocal makes it utterly gripping and believable – an alchemist at work." During the same year, Parade magazine voted the song as the sixth best of her songs. In February 2023, USA Today voted the song Houston's eighth best song, comparing the chorus to the Dreamgirls hit, "And I Am Telling You I'm Not Going". In 2024, Entertainment Weekly ranked it number 7 in their list of 25 best Whitney Houston songs. In the same year, Smooth Radio voted the ballad the 50th greatest movie song of all time. In February 2025, Billboard magazine ranked it number six in their list of "Top 100 Breakup Songs of All Time", naming it "one of Houston's most stunning vocal performances", adding that the song "is the epitome of continuing to fight for something long after it’s already over." Paste ranked the song fifth place in its list of "The 50 Best Original Songs Written for Films", writing that the ballad helped Houston to "[make] sure to flaunt her talents on the unforgettable soundtrack with some of the best work of her career." In 2026, Essence magazine ranked the song the third greatest R&B song of all time, only behind "Can We Talk" by Tevin Campbell and "As" by Stevie Wonder.

=== Covers and samples ===
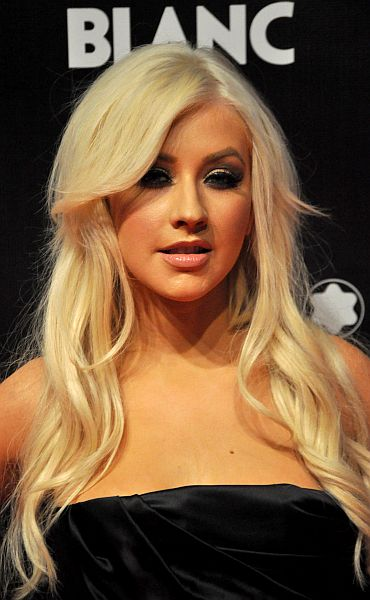
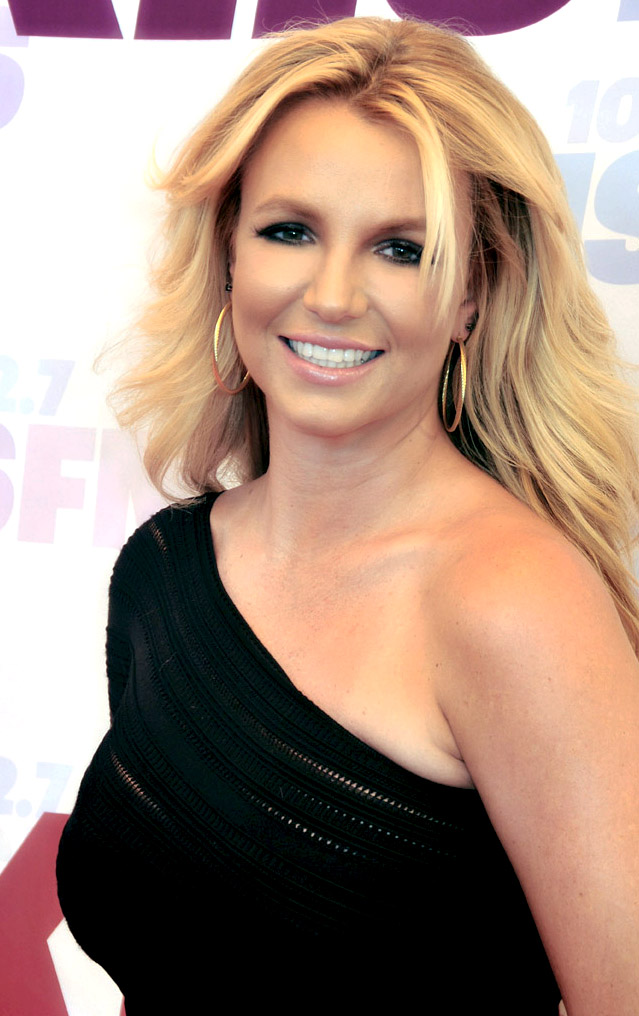
Singers Christina Aguilera and Britney Spears covered "I Have Nothing" early in their careers

==== Official recording versions ====
Filipino singer Jake Zyrus recorded a version of the song on his debut release, the self-titled Charice EP released in May 2008. Korean singer SunMin has a cover of the song on her mini album Cover Girl, released in Japan, August 2008. The Italian variety TV show, Ti Lascio Una Canzone alumna Sonia Mosca covered the song on the compilation album Ti Lascio Una Canzone - La Compilation, released in May 2009. In 2012, the song is performed on the TV musical series Glee in episode 17 of season 3, "Dance with Somebody", by Chris Colfer (as his character Kurt Hummel). The whole episode pays tribute to Whitney Houston and her music.

According to the sample database site, WhoSampled, the song has been covered over 128 times, becoming Houston's third most covered song and her second most covered original song after "I Wanna Dance with Somebody (Who Loves Me)". Along with Zyrus and Colfer, other official recording versions have been produced by artists such as Jessie J, Jack Vidgen, Deborah Cox and David Phelps.

==== Demonstration versions ====
Jessica Simpson recorded a version of the song as a demonstration when she was a teenager. Britney Spears revealed on VH1's Behind the Music, originally aired on November 9, 2003, that she recorded a demonstration of the song before she was signed to Jive Records. Spears also later sang the song at her Jive audition at the age of fifteen.

==== Live cover versions ====
On behalf of Houston who had given birth to a daughter the three weeks before the ceremony, Natalie Cole crooned Houston's two nominated songs including "I Have Nothing" at the 65th Annual Academy Awards on March 29, 1993.

Christina Aguilera sang this song on The Mickey Mouse Club, with Britney Spears and Justin Timberlake singing backup. Years later, in November 2017, Aguilera also performed "I Have Nothing" as a tribute to Houston at the 2017 American Music Awards.

Patti LaBelle performed the song as a tribute to Whitney Houston, the first ever recipient of the Triumphant Spirit Award at the 10th annual Essence Awards, taped on April 4, 1997, and broadcast later on Fox TV, May 22, 1997.

Other live performances of the song have been done by singers Jazmine Sullivan and Glennis Grace.

Jessie J performed the song on the Chinese TV talent show Singer in 2018.

Ariana Grande performed "I Have Nothing" in 2014 at The White House, along with some select dates such as Manila on her Honeymoon Tour.

In March 2025, Kelly Clarkson performed the song on the 1,000th episode of her talk show, the Kelly Clarkson Show.

==== Covers on talent shows ====
The song has gained notoriety for being constantly performed on several talent shows, including both the British and American renditions of The X Factor, Britain's Got Talent, America's Got Talent, The Voice, The Masked Singer, and most prominently, American Idol.

On the latter show, the song is the most performed song in the show's history since 2002, with the song being performed fourteen times on the show. One of the most acclaimed performances of the song came from then-season three contestant Jennifer Hudson in 2004.

Hudson later performed the song during the Idol tour featuring all thirteen of the show's finalists. Other notable American Idol covers of the song came from contestants such as Leah LaBelle, Trenyce, Vonzell Solomon and Katharine McPhee. All four performances got similar praise of their covers as Hudson's. Like Hudson, McPhee has also performed the song on her own live.

The covers of the song on American Idol helped Houston to become the most covered female artist on the program, with over fifty covers of her music being performed on the talent show.

Vocal coaches Carrie and David Grant, who worked with contestants on the British talent shows Pop Idol and Fame Academy, told the BBC in 2022 that the song, among some of the singer's other landmark recordings such as "Greatest Love of All" and "I Will Always Love You", became a gold standard that was rarely attainable.

Said Carrie Grant, "Just about every singer we taught or auditioned for about five years wanted to master I Will Always Love You or The Greatest Love of All or I Have Nothing... Most of [them] should have tried something a little easier – many a singer has been wiped out in an attempt to do Whitney!"

==== Samples ====
Drake sampled the song for "Tuscan Leather", the opening song from his third acclaimed studio album Nothing Was the Same (2013).

Other rap artists who have sampled it include French Montana, Central Cee and Rod Wave. According to WhoSampled, the ballad has been sampled 22 times.

== Track listings and formats ==
- UK 12-inch vinyl single

A1. "I Have Nothing" ― 4:45
A2. "All the Man That I Need" ― 3:54
B1. "Where You Are" ― 4:10
B2. "Lover for Life" ― 4:48

- European 7-inch vinyl single; Japanese 3-inch CD single

A. "I Have Nothing" ― 4:45
B. "Where You Are" ― 4:10

- UK 7-inch vinyl single

A. "I Have Nothing" ― 4:45
B. "All the Man That I Need" ― 3:54

- US maxi-CD single; European maxi-CD single; UK maxi-CD single
1. "I Have Nothing" ― 4:45
2. "Where You Are" ― 4:10
3. "Lover for Life" ― 4:48
- UK CD single
1. "I Have Nothing" ― 4:45
2. "All the Man That I Need" ― 3:54
3. "Where You Are" ― 4:10
4. "Lover for Life" ― 4:48

== Credits and personnel ==
Credits are adapted from The Bodyguard: Original Soundtrack Album liner notes.

"I Have Nothing"

- Whitney Houston – vocals, vocal arrangement
- David Foster – producer, arranger, keyboards, bass
- Jeremy Lubbock and David Foster – string arrangement
- Michael Landau – guitar
- Simon Franglen – Synclavier and synth programming
- Dave Reitzas – recording engineer
- Mick Guzauski – mixing engineer

== Charts ==
=== Weekly charts ===
Chart (1993)	Peak position
Australia (ARIA)	28
Belgium (Ultratop 50 Flanders)	16
Canada Top Singles (RPM)	1
Canada Adult Contemporary (RPM)	1
Canada Contemporary Hit Radio (The Record)	1
Denmark (IFPI)	9
Europe (Eurochart Hot 100)	9
Europe (European Hit Radio)	3
France (SNEP)	50
Germany (GfK)	39
Iceland (Íslenski Listinn Topp 40)	13
Ireland (IRMA)	4
Israel (Israeli Singles Chart)	5
Netherlands (Dutch Top 40)	22
Netherlands (Single Top 100)	23
New Zealand (Recorded Music NZ)	20
Panama (UPI)	4
Portugal (AFP)	7
Quebec (ADISQ)	1
Switzerland (Schweizer Hitparade)	39
UK Singles (Official Charts)	3
UK Airplay (Music Week)	4
US Billboard Hot 100	4
US Adult Contemporary (Billboard)	1
US Hot R&B/Hip-Hop Songs (Billboard)	4
US Pop Airplay (Billboard)	3
US Rhythmic Airplay (Billboard)	4
US Cash Box Top 100	1
US R&B Singles (Cash Box)	2
US CHR/Pop Airplay (Radio & Records)	1

Chart (2012)	Peak position
Australia (ARIA)	47
Canada Digital Song Sales (Billboard)	72
France (SNEP)	29
Netherlands (Single Top 100)	48
South Korea International (Circle)	27
Spain (Promusicae)	23
Switzerland (Schweizer Hitparade)	39
UK Singles (Official Charts)	44
US Digital Song Sales (Billboard)	38

Chart (2021)	Peak position
UK Singles Sales Chart (OCC)	66

=== Year-end charts ===
Chart (1993)	Position
Canada Top Singles (RPM)	14
Canada Adult Contemporary (RPM)	4
Europe (Eurochart Hot 100)	100
Netherlands (Dutch Top 40)	181
UK Singles (OCC)	59
US Billboard Hot 100	30
US Hot Adult Contemporary Singles & Tracks (Billboard)	17
US Hot R&B Singles (Billboard)	32
US Cash Box Top 100	11

== Certifications ==
Region	Certification	Certified units/sales
Denmark (IFPI Danmark)	Gold	45,000^{‡}
Italy (FIMI)	Gold	50,000^{‡}
New Zealand (RMNZ)	2× Platinum	60,000^{‡}
Spain (Promusicae)	Gold	30,000^{‡}
United Kingdom (BPI)	2× Platinum	1,200,000^{‡}
United States (RIAA)	4× Platinum	4,000,000^{‡}
^{‡} Sales+streaming figures based on certification alone.

== Release history ==
Region	Date	Format(s)	Label(s)	Ref.
United States	February 20, 1993	7-inch vinyl; CD; cassette	Arista	
Sweden	April 5, 1993	CD	Arista	
United Kingdom	April 12, 1993	7-inch vinyl; 12-inch vinyl; CD; cassette	Arista	
Japan	April 21, 1993	Mini-CD	Arista	
Australia	April 26, 1993	CD; cassette	Arista	
