= Shin Hye-sung discography =

- Studio albums: 8
- Soundtrack albums: 12
- Live albums: 1
- Compilation albums: 4
- Singles: 21
- Video albums: 4

Shin Hye-sung, Main vocalist of the Korean boyband Shinhwa, has had a solo singing career concurrent with his Shinhwa activities since 2005. His discography consists of seven Korean-language studio albums, one Japanese-language studio albums, and two compilation albums, one each released in Korea and in Japan. He also released re-recordings of six of his previous duets with new singers in 2014, as part of his "Once Again" project, as well as recorded 12 songs for soundtracks.

== Albums ==
=== Studio albums ===
Title	Album details	Peak chart positions			Sales
Title	Album details	KOR (RIAK)^{[A]}	KOR (Gaon)^{[B]}	JPN	Sales
Love of May (五.月.之.戀)	Released: May 6, 2005 (EKLD-0578); Special Edition: August 27, 2005 (EKLD-0630); Label: Good EMG, IO Music; Formats: CD	2	—	—	KOR: 183,463
The Beginning, New Days	Released: August 8, 2007(VDCD-6028); Special Edition: October 24, 2007(VDCD-6044); Label: Good EMG, Vitamin Entertainment; Formats CD	1	—	—	KOR: 94,290
Live and Let Live	Released: August 26, 2008 (YDCD-851); Label: Good EMG, Yedang Entertainment; Formats: CD	2	—	—	KOR: 48,271
Keep Leaves	Released: February 17, 2009 (YDCD-881); Label: Good EMG, Yedang Entertainment; Formats: CD	N/A	—	—	
Find Voice in Song	Released: February 24, 2010 (JPN) (TKCA-73513); Label: Tokuma Japan Communications, Liveworks; Formats: CD	N/A	5	39	
The Road Not Taken	Released: June 16, 2011 (CMCC-9754); Label: Liveworks, CJ E&M; Formats: CD	N/A	3	40	KOR: 16,496
Embrace	Released: December 27, 2011 (CMCC-9856); Label: Liveworks, CJ E&M; Formats: CD	N/A	1	—	KOR: 6,571
Winter Poetry	Released: December 4, 2012 (CMCC-10031); Label: Liveworks, CJ E&M; Formats: CD	N/A	1	—	KOR: 24,102
Delight	Released: January 12, 2016; Label: Liveworks, CJ E&M; Formats: CD	N/A	—	—	KOR: 10,676
Serenity	Released: September 5, 2017; Label: Music&NEW; Formats: CD	N/A	2	—	KOR: 29,580
"—" denotes releases that did not chart or were not released in that region.

=== Live albums ===
Title	Album details	Peak chart positions	Sales
Title	Album details	KOR	Sales
2012-2013 Shin Hye-sung Concert The Year's Journey	Released: August 30, 2013 (VDCD-6434); Label: Liveworks, Vitamin Entertainment; Format: 2 CD	8	KOR: 10,000

=== Compilation albums ===
Title	Album details	Peak chart positions		Sales
Title	Album details	KOR	JPN	Sales
五・月・之・戀+The Beginning, New Days Love of May + The Beginning, New Days	Released: August 22, 2007 (PCCA-02455); Label: Pony Canyon; Formats: CD	—	54	
Collection 2010 ~My Everything~	Released: February 24, 2010 (TKCA-73514); Label: Tokuma Japan Communications; Formats: CD	—	67	
The Cycle	Released: July 19, 2010 (L100004114); Label: Liveworks, LOEN Entertainment, IKpop; Formats: CD	2	—	
Japan Premium Winter Album	Released: March 13, 2013 (POCE-32021/2); Label: Liveworks; Formats: CD	—	189	
"—" denotes releases that did not chart or were not released in that region.

=== Video albums ===
Title	Album details
First Tour in Seoul	Released: April 16, 2008; Label: Good EMG; Formats: DVD
Live Tour Side 1 - Live And Let Live In Seoul	Released: August 27, 2009; Label: Good EMG; Formats: DVD
Keep Leaves Tour In Seoul	Released: July 26, 2010; Label: Liveworks; Language: Korean; Formats: DVD
2012-2013 Shin Hye-sung Concert The Year's Journey	Released: December 26, 2013; Label: Liveworks; Formats: DVD

== Extended plays ==
Title	Album details	Peak chart positions	Sales
Title	Album details	KOR	Sales
Setlist	Released: October 8, 2019; Label: Music&NEW; Formats: CD, download, streaming	5	KOR: 14,168

== Singles ==
Title	Year	Peak chart positions		Album
Title	Year	KOR	JPN	Album
"Same Thought" (같은생각)	2005	—	—	Love of May
"Don't Leave" (떠나지마)	2005	—	—	Love of May
"Mirror" (거울)	2005	—	—	Love of May
"First Person" (첫사람)	2007	—	—	The Beginning, New Days
"Even If I Erase, Throw Away, Forget..." (지우고, 버리고, 잊어도...)	2007	—	—	The Beginning, New Days (Special Edition)
"Because It's You" (그대라서)	2008	—	—	Live and Let Live
"Why Did You Call..." (왜 전화했어...)	2009	—	—	Keep Leaves
"Ex-Mind"	2010	85	—	The Cycle
"Hello and Goodbye" (안녕 그리고 안녕) (feat. Eric Mun and Nam Gyu-ri)	2010	35	—	The Road Not Taken
"Just a Bit More" (조금 더 가까이) (with Go Young-joon)	2011	60	—	The Road Not Taken
"Tick Tock" (째각째각)	2011	62	—	The Road Not Taken
"I Believe" (with Shunsuke Kiyokiba)	2011	—	7	Love Songs ~Ballad Selections~
"Come Back" (돌아와줘)	2011	49	—	Embrace
"It'd Be Nice if it Was You" (그대라면 좋을텐데)	2012	51	—	Winter Poetry
"Buen Camino" (feat. Lyn)	2014	28	—	Remake Project "Once Again" song #1
"Doll" (인형) (feat. Im Chang-jung)	2014	14	—	Remake Project "Once Again" song #2
"Ex-Mind" (feat. Snacky Chan)	2014	—	—	Remake Project "Once Again" song #3
"Like a Child" (어린애처럼)	2014	82	—	Discovery of Love OST Part 9
"Love...After" (사랑...후에) (feat. Ock Joo-hyun)	2014	52	—	Remake Project "Once Again" song #4
"First Person" (첫사람) (feat. Vanilla Acoustic)	2014	—	—	Remake Project "Once Again" song #5
"Because It's You" (그대라서) (feat. Dear Cloud)	2014	—	—	Remake Project "Once Again" song #6

== Soundtrack appearances ==
Title	Year	Album
"I Promise" (약속해요)	2005	The 101st Proposal OST
"Don't You Know" (모르겠나요)	2005	Super Rookie OST
"Sky" (하늘)	2005	Let's Go to the Beach OST
"Day After Day" (하루 또 하루)	2006	Alone in Love OST (Japanese version)
"You are the Wind" (그대는 바람)	2007	Cruel Love OST
"Words Said by the Eyes" (눈이 하는 말)	2008	Gourmet OST
"Together Tetris" (함께 테트리스)	2008	Tetris Returns (game)
"You're Beautiful" (그대는 예뻐요)	2009	He Who Can't Marry OST
"Timeless Memory"	2010	A Better Tomorrow OST
"Like Bitterness Like Admiration" (여원여모)	2011	The Princess' Man OST
"Like a Child" (어린애처럼)	2014	Discovery of Love OST

== Featured artist ==
Title	Details	Album
Lee Ji-hoon and Shin Hye-sung "Doll" (Korean: "인형")	Released: January 31, 2001	Lee Ji-hoon; Special With
DJ Chully feat. Shin Hye-sung, Eric, Inchang E "Shining Good - Dog Life" (Korean: 빛좋은 개살구")	Released: October 10, 2001	DJ Chully; Cross Over Vol. 1
Shin Hye-sung "Please Accept Me" (Korean: "나를 받으옵소서")	Released: December 18, 2001	Various Artists; The Gift
Jang Na-ra and Shin Hye-sung "Lover" (Korean: "연인")	Released: December 20, 2004	Jang Na-ra; My Story (Korean: 나의 이야기)
All Star (including Shin Hye-sung) "When That Day Comes" (Korean: "그날이 오면")	Released: December 24, 2004	Various Artists; Love Love Uniform Desire (Korean: Love 사랑 통일염원)
Lee Soo-young feat. Shin Hye-sung & Lee Ji-hoon "Story of Separation" (Korean: "이별 이야기)	Released: January 13, 2005	Lee Soo-young; As Time Goes By
Michael Learns to Rock feat. Shin Hye-sung "Take Me To Your Heart"	Released: April 22, 2005	Michael Learns to Rock; All the Best (Korean edition)
SMAP feat. Shin Hye-sung "Sky ~Eternal Love~" (Japanese: "ハヌル～ヨンウォナンサラン～")	Released: July 27, 2005	SMAP; Sample Bang!
Shin Hye-sung "Day After Day" (Korean: "하루 또 하루")	Released: May 11, 2006	Shin Hye-sung, Kim Hyun-sung Power Single (Korean: 신혜성 김현성 파워싱글)
Shin Hye-sung "A Poem for Poetry" (Korean: "시를 위한 시")	Released: February 27, 2006; September 14, 2006	Various Artists - We, For Love, vol. 2 (Korean: 우리，사랑하는 동안, vol. 2); Various Artists - Old Love, The Story of Musicians (Korean: 옛사랑, The Story of Musicians)
Sunmin and Shin Hye-sung "Keep Holding U"	Released: August 31, 2006	Sunmin; Sunmin ThanX Hye-sung (Korean: 선민 ThanX 혜성)
Shin Hye-sung and Lyn "Love...After" (Korean: "사랑...후에")	Released: December 20, 2006	Various Artists - Assimilation (Korean: 동화 (冬話))
Shin Hye-sung "Lover" (Korean: "애인")	Released: January 29, 2007	Cho Young-soo; All Star 1st
Kim Dong-wan and Shin Hye-sung "The One Who Remains" (Korean: "남은 사람")	Released: June 28, 2007	Kim Dongwan; Kimdongwan Is
Lyn and Shin Hye-sung "It Was You" (Korean: "그대죠")	Released: February 27, 2008	Lyn and Shin Hye-sung "He Said...She Said..." (Korean: 그 남자 그 여자 이야기)
Shin Hye-sung "Social Enterprise" song (Korean: 사회적기업)	Released: June 30, 2008	Recorded as "Ambassador of Public Relations for Social; Enterprise"for the Seoul Gangnam District Ministry of Labor
Shin Hye-sung "Purple Rain"	Released: July 7, 2008	Various Artists; Color Purple series
Various Artists (including Shin Hye-sung) "Smile Again"	Released: July 1, 2008	I Love Asia Project, benefit for the 2008 Sichuan earthquake

== Notes ==
- A The Recording Industry Association Korea (RIAK) tracked physical album, EP, and singles sales and released a consolidated sales and ranking chart monthly from January 1999 to September 2008. It did not track digital sales.
- B The Gaon Music Chart began releasing data in 2010 after the Recording Industry Association Korea stopped compiling data in October 2008. Online sources for charts released after September 2008 and before January 2010 are currently unavailable.
