= Steve Barakatt =

Canadian musician

- Born: May 17, 1973 (age 53)
- Occupations: Composer; music producer; Singer; Creative director
- Instrument: Piano

Steve Barakatt CQ (born May 17, 1973) is a Lebanese-Canadian composer, music producer, pianist, singer and creative director. He was made a Knight of the National Order of Quebec in 2020 and a National Ambassador of UNICEF Canada (2007-2016).

== Early years ==
When he was four, he began piano lessons. Over the next 10 years he studied classical music, and then switched to jazz. Barakatt enjoyed many challenging musical experiences from an early age, including that of guest soloist with l'Orchestre symphonique de Québec when he was 13. When he was 16, he became fascinated by composition, arranging and production. He studied the new technology available and soon mastered all the intricacies of music programming. So much so that the Japanese firm Roland invited him to present their new products at the 1992 NAMM Show in Anaheim, California.

Barakatt has appeared as a guest performer and recording artist with a range of ensembles and orchestras, including the Alexandrov Ensemble (Red Army Choir) and the Tokyo Philharmonic Orchestra.

== Recording artist ==
Barakatt recorded his first solo album, Double Joie, when he was 14. It was released in Canada on November 11, 1987, and less than a week later the album was in the top 20 best-selling albums.

He has composed and produced numerous instrumental albums: Audacity, Escape, Steve Barakatt LIVE, Quebec, Eternity, A Love Affair, All About Us, Someday, Somewhere and Néoréalité. These recordings reached the charts in many countries around the world and his music is broadcast on various radio stations. A number of his compositions are also used as themes for popular TV shows.

In August 2020, he signed an agreement with the record label Universal Music MENA for the global distribution of his future recordings.

== Composer and producer ==
As composer/producer, Barakatt has collaborated with many artists from all over the world. In 1997, Barakatt produced the young Canadian singer, Natasha St-Pier's album. His composition "Sans le Savoir" hit the top 5 on the radio charts, and the video of the song became number one on Musique Plus, Quebec's MTV.

In 1997, he wrote many other songs including "C'est une Promesse" for the Canadian singer Johanne Blouin, and "En la arena" for Argentina's male singer Guillermo Saldana.

In Hong Kong, Barakatt has been asked to compose for a number of artists. In 1995, he composed "Mou Tian" which was performed by the Asian stars Kelly Chen, Joyce Yau, Daniel Chan and Ray Chan. In 1996 he composed a duet for Leon Lai and Alan Tam, Song of Stars, which featured them singing together for the first time on record. Barakatt also wrote "Ni Shi Shui" for Leon Lai's solo album, Feel Leon, released the same year.

In Japan, Barakatt's song "Kaze To Kino Uta-Quebec 1608" was performed by the Japanese singer Sincere. The popular singer Yoko Oginome recorded Barakatt's composition "We'll Be Together" and the song became the main theme for the TV show Shitteru Tsumori on the NTV network. Barakatt composed "Watashi Dake De Ite" for Noriko Sakai. His instrumental selection "Nuit d'Amour à Paris" was the theme for the TV drama Kiss Again on the NHK network. Barakatt's compositions have been used in major TV sports programs including the FIFA World Cup 2002 in Japan (NHK) as well as for the F1 Grand Prix of Monaco (Fuji TV).

Barakatt also composed the score for the TV series Urban Myth Chillers starring Omar Sharif. In 2006, Barakatt composed and produced the song "Here We Are", in which he duets with Canadian singer, Audrey de Montigny. The song is featured on Barakatt's first vocal album, Here I Am and simultaneously on de Montignyy's album Take Me As I Am. In 2007, Barakatt collaborates again with her when he produced John Lennon's song "Love" for the Amnesty International project "Make Some Noise" in collaboration with Yoko Ono.

In 2010, Barakatt was invited to perform the song "You Are Not Alone" in duet with Korean R&B singer Wheesung on Michael Jackson's compilation album Winter Night.

== Ad Vitam Aeternam ==
In 2003, Barakatt was inspired to create a music work of a major scale, by composing and conceiving a symphonic work based on the sixteen stages of human experience. After more than 30 months creating this work, on September 30, 2005, the world premiere of "Ad Vitam Aeternam" was presented at the Grand Théâtre de Québec accompanied by Orchestre Symphonique de Québec.

On June 16, 2006, the European premiere was presented at Yaroslavl, Russia with the "Yaroslavl Symphony Orchestra" under the baton of Murad Annamamedov.

On September 7, 2007, "Ad Vitam Aeternam" was performed by Barakatt for the first time in Asia with the Ditto Chamber Orchestra under the baton of Gilles Ouellet.

This production was an official event for the 400th anniversary of Quebec City, Canada. Several concerts were presented on June 17–18–19, 2008, at the Grand Theatre of Quebec. In 2010, "Ad Vitam Aeternam" was performed during the festivities celebrating the 1,000th anniversary of the city of Yaroslavl, Russia a UNESCO World Heritage Site.

On November 19, 2014, "Ad Vitam Aeternam" was performed by Barakatt at the Great Hall of the Tchaikovsky Moscow Conservatory with the Yaroslavl Academic Symphony Orchestra under the baton of Murad Annamamedov. "Ad Vitam Aeternam" commemorated the 25th anniversary of the Convention on the Rights of the Child. Ambassadors & Officials representing more than 30 countries attended the event in Moscow.

== Here I Am (vocal project) ==
In 2007, Barakatt released his first vocal album Here I Am. Several songs have been recorded at Sir George Martin's Air Studios in London featuring the Foundation Philharmonic Orchestra and several renowned musicians.

== Lullaby, The UNICEF Anthem ==
In 2009, Barakatt composed the UNICEF International Anthem, Lullaby, a choral symphony which has been premiered by symphony orchestras on five continents and in space on the international space station on November 20, 2009. Several musicians and ensembles have performed in the original recording including conductor Myung-whun Chung, the Orchestre Philharmonique de Radio France, Nana Mouskouri, Angélique Kidjo, Helmut Lotti, Leon Lai, Agnes Chan, Maxim Vengerov, Richard O'Neill, Miri Ben-Ari, Maîtrise de Radio France and The choir of the City of Prague Philharmonic Orchestra. To mark this historical moment, symphony orchestras in 15 countries have performed the anthem. A music video have been produced and released to raise awareness among the world population on the importance of the convention on the rights of the child. "Lullaby, The UNICEF Anthem" has been watched in space by the Belgian astronaut Frank De Winne during a mission on the International Space Station. On March 16, 2010, Barakatt performed "Lullaby, The UNICEF Anthem" at Tokyo's Nippon Budokan. On February 22, 2012, Barakatt performed the anthem during an event organized by "Monaco Disease Power" under the presidency and in the presence of Prince Albert II of Monaco. On November 19, 2014, "Lullaby, The UNICEF Anthem" was performed by Barakatt at the Great Hall of the Tchaikovsky Moscow Conservatory with the Yaroslavl Academic Symphony Orchestra under the conductor Murad Annamamedov and the Children's Theatre DOMISOLKA. The performance commemorated the 25th anniversary of the Convention on the Rights of the Child and the fifth anniversary of "Lullaby, The UNICEF Anthem". Ambassadors & Official representing more than 35 countries attended the historic event in Moscow. On December 7, 2015, Barakatt performed "Lullaby, The UNICEF Anthem" at the Moscow Kremlin during the concert event to mark the 25th anniversary of the foundation of DOMISOLKA who performed the Anthem with Barakatt on stage.

== International Anthem of the Royal Golf Clubs ==
In 2017, Barakatt was commissioned by Lieutenant Governor of Quebec to compose the International Anthem of the Royal Golf Clubs. On September 12, 2017, the International of the Royal Golf Clubs was premiered at by La Musique du Royal 22e Régiment at La Citadelle de Québec

== Usage by Korail ==
Upon the launching of South Korea's high speed rail system, the Korea Train eXpress (KTX), Korail used Barakatt's "Dreamers" for announcing arrival at the destination station until 2010, replacing "Looking for You" by Japanese saxophonist 'MALTA'. After 2010, "California Vibes" is played while a pre-recorded announcement informs passengers of the arrival of a station. The announcement declares the station name and reminds passengers to gather their belongings as they disembark the train.

== The Official Anthem of Chateau Frontenac ==
On April 13, 2018, Le Château Frontenac became the first heritage building in the world to have its own official anthem. Barakatt composed the anthem and performed the world premiere in the Chateau Frontenac's Grand Ballroom with l'Orchestre Symphonique de Québec under the baton of Maestro Fabien Gabel.

== Le Phare ==
Canadian firm Groupe Dallaire announced on November 15, 2016, the appointment of Barakatt as Creative Director of Le Phare real estate project in charge of the entertainment activities. Barakatt will supervise the conception of the facilities, the production of new entertainment content as well as the establishment of new partnerships for the creation of a world-class experience.

== Awards and honours ==
- Winner of the Sillery music festival (1984 and 1986)
- 3 Nominations by the ADISQ (Between 1987 and 2005)
- Youngest recipient of the Order of Merit of the Saint-Jean-Baptiste Society (1988)
- Nominated for the "Prix Rayonnement hors Québec" – Grands Québécois (1996)
- Certificate of acknowledgement from the United Nations (2004)
- Recipient of the ARISTA Bank of Montreal Prize "Young International Business Leader in Quebec" (2005)
- Young Personality of the Year (National and International) Youth Chamber of Commerce of Quebec (2005)
- Recipient of the Pierre-Garon prize (Artist of the year, Quebec City) (2006)
- Honorary Governor of The Duke of Edinburgh's Award in recognition of his contribution for the program in Quebec (2006)
- SOCAN's Hagood Hardy Award-Composer of the Year-Instrumental (2010)
- Plaque of Appreciation offered by the Prime Minister of the Republic of South Korea for the support and promotion of the City of Saemangeum (2017)
- Lieutenant Governor's Medal for Exceptional Merit (2019)
- Knight of the National Order of Quebec (2021)
- Great International Friend of the City of Jeonju, Republic of Korea (2023)
- Medal of Quebec City, Canada (2024)

== Discography ==
=== Work as recording artist ===
- Double-Joie (1987)
- Audace/Audacity (1994)
- Escape (1996)
- Steve Barakatt Live (1997)
- Quebec (1998)
- Eternity (1999)
- A Love Affair (2000)
- Rainbow Bridge – The Collection (2000)
- All About Us (2001)
- The Best of Steve Barakatt (2004)
- The Best Inspirations (2005)
- Here I Am (2007)
- Someday, Somewhere (2011)
- "Dear Charlotte" – Single (2015)
- "Dear Charlotte" (Piano Solo) – Single (2015)
- "Moonlight Dream" – Single (2015)
- "Symphony of Greatest Hits" – Single (2015)
- "I Can't Live Without You" – Single (2016)
- "The Official Anthem of Chateau Frontenac" (2018)
- "One More Heart, One More Dream – The Official Anthem of Saemangeum" (2018)
- "Sursum Corda in Beirut" - Single (2020)
- "Autumn in Quebec, The Landscape" - Single (2020)
- "Néoréalité" - Album (2021)
- "Motherland" - Single (2022)
- "Give Me Some Love" - Single (2024)
- "Jeonju Rhapsody (The Official Anthem)" - Single (2024)

=== Work as a composer/producer/pianist ===
- Emergence for Natasha St-Pier (1995)
- Mou Tian for Kelly Chen, Daniel Chan, Joyce Yau, Ray Chan (1995)
- En La Aerena for Guillermo Saldana (1995)
- The Song of Stars for Leon Lai & Alan Tam (1996)
- Ni Shi Shui for Leon Lai (1996)
- C'est un promesse for Johanne Blouin (1997)
- Kaze To Kino Uta for Sincere (1998)
- Shitteru Tsumori for Yoko Oginome (1999)
- Watashi Dake Ite for Noriko Sakai (2000)
- Here We Are for Audrey De Montigny (2006)
- Love performed by Audrey de Montigny for Amnesty International's Make Some Noise (2007)
- Rainbow Bridge performed by Sunmin (2010)
- You Are Not Alone performed in duet with Wheesung (2010)
- I'm Sorry + My Funny Valentine performed with John Park (2011)
- Imagine with Chen of EXO (2016)
- Sound of Your Heart with Lee Dong-woo, Yesung of Super Junior, Sunny of Girls' Generation, Luna of f(x), Wendy and Seulgi of Red Velvet, and Taeil and Doyoung of NCT (2016)
- Devenir - The Official Anthem of Ordre national du Québec (2021)

== UNICEF Ambassador ==
On March 9, 2007, Barakatt and his wife, Russian-born Olympic gymnast Elena Grosheva, were both appointed UNICEF Canada Ambassadors. They were the first couple to be given that honor.

== IMAGINE for UNICEF ==
Barakatt is among the international artists who participated in the IMAGINE for UNICEF project in recording a new version of John Lennon's "Imagine". The music video has been filmed in Tashkent, Uzbekistan in November 2015.

== Ensembles and artists who performed Barakatt's compositions ==
- L'Orchestre symphonique de Québec (Canada)
- L'Orchestre Métropolitain du Grand Montréal (Canada)
- The City of Prague Philharmonic Orchestra (Czech Republic)
- Astana Opera Symphony Orchestra (Kazakhstan)
- The Vancouver Youth Symphony Orchestra (Canada)
- The Delta Youth Orchestra (Canada)
- The Greater Victoria Youth Orchestra (Canada)
- The Ottawa Youth Orchestra (Canada)
- The Kitchener Waterloo Symphony Orchestra (Canada)
- The Cleveland Symphony Orchestra (Australia)
- The Lahti Symphony Orchestra (Finland)
- L'Orchestre Philharmonique de Radio France (France)
- La Maitrise de Radio France (France)
- The Hong Kong Chinese Orchestra (China)
- The choir of the City of Prague Philharmonic Orchestra
- Royal Canadian Air Force Band (Canada)
- Korean Pops Orchestra (South Korea)
- The Edward Said National Youth Conservatory (Palestinian Occupied Territories)
- Polish Radio Symphony Orchestra (Poland)
- Auckland Symphony Orchestra (New Zealand)
- The Bilkent Symphony Orchestra (Turkey)
- Nana Mouskouri
- Richard O'Neill
- Helmut Lotti
- Angelique Kidjo
- Maxim Vengerov
- Andrew Wan (OSM)
- Agnes Chan
- Miri Ben-Ari
- The Alexandrov Red Army Choir
- Natasha St-Pier
- Joo-Hyun Kim
- Myung-whun Chung
- Yoav Talmi
- Yannick Nézet-Séguin
- Yaroslavl Academic Symphony Orchestra
- Kelly Chen
- Daniel Chan
- Joyce Yau
- John Park
- Ray Chan
- Guillermo Saldana
- Children's Choir DOMISOLKA
- Leon Lai
- Alan Tam
- Johanne Blouin
- Sincere
- Yoko Oginome
- Noriko Sakai
- Audrey De Montigny
- SunMin
- Yiruma
- Yuhki Kuramoto
