= Sony Urban Music =

Division of Sony BMG music (2004–2006)

- Type: Division
- Founded: 2003
- Defunct: 2006
- Fate: Company terminated
- Successor: Sony Music Entertainment
- Headquarters: U.S.
- Key people: Lisa Ellis (president)
- Products: Music & entertainment

Sony Urban Music was a division of Sony BMG, active from 2003 to 2006, The division handled R&B, soul, and hip hop releases by artists nominally signed to Sony's Columbia and Epic labels. During its existence, Sony Urban managed releases by artists such as Nas, Bow Wow, John Legend, Omarion, Bossman, DMX, Beyoncé, Amerie, Keshia Chanté and contemporary Christian music duo Anointed.

In March 2004, the division's general manager became Lisa Ellis, and president in 2005.

In November 2006, it was announced that Sony Urban Music would be terminated.The division was placed under the umbrella of the Columbia Records label. All of the artists handled by Sony Urban were returned to either Columbia or Epic, with a handful of exceptions. R&B singer Omarion switched from Epic to Columbia, where he recorded a duets album with rapper Bow Wow. New signees Sa-Ra, signed to Columbia through Kanye West's G.O.O.D. Music imprint, negotiated their release during the restructuring.

== Albums ==
- Bravehearted (Bravehearts): 2003
- U Gotta Feel Me (Lil' Flip): 2004
- Destiny Fulfilled (Destiny's Child): 2004
- Time to Share (Toshinobu Kubota): 2004
- Street's Disciple (Nas): 2004
- Weapons of Mass Destruction (Xzibit): 2004
- Get Lifted (John Legend): 2004
- Lyfe 268-192 (Lyfe Jennings): 2004
- Touch (Amerie): 2005
- O (Omarion): 2005
- Choices II: The Setup (Three 6 Mafia): 2005
- Most Known Unknown (Three 6 Mafia): 2005
- Most Known Hits (Three 6 Mafia): 2005
- B'Day (Beyoncé): 2006
- The Phoenix (Lyfe Jennings): 2006
- Cash on Delivery (Ray Cash): 2006
- Year of the Dog... Again (DMX): 2006
- Once Again (John Legend): 2006
- Crook By Da Book: The Fed Story (Project Pat): 2006
- 21 (Omarion): 2006
- 2U (Keshia Chanté): 2006
