= Bonga Wanga =

Studio album by Toshinobu Kubota
- Released: July 15, 1990
- Recorded: 1989–1990
- Genres: R&B, old skool, African, go-go, reggae fusion
- Length: 64:24
- Label: Sony Music Entertainment Japan
- Producers: Hitoshi Ishitani (exex. producer), Yasohachi Itoh (exec. producer), Toshinobu Kubota

Toshinobu Kubota chronology
The Baddest (1989)	Bonga Wanga (1990)	Kiss My Thang: Toshinobu Kubota's Selection (1990)

Singles from Bonga Wanga
- 1. "Be Wanabee / Mama Udongo (Mabuta No Naka Ni)" Released: October 1, 1990; 2. "Dai Bora Of Life" Released: 1990

Bonga Wanga is the fourth studio album of Japanese singer Toshinobu Kubota, released on July 15, 1990. Under the label, Kubota released his first single, "Be Wanabee" in October 1990, followed by "Mama Udongo" in March 1991. The lead single "Be Wanabee" charted at number 16 on the Oricon Weekly Singles chart. "Bonga Wanga" became Kubota's first album to peak number one on the Oricon Albums chart. The album also became certified million. That album contains several English lyrics.

In 1991, Kubota went on the Bonga Wanga Tour. In July 1991, Kubota release his concert videotape/DVD "Bonga Wonga Spring Tour 1991".

== Track listing ==
No.	Title	Lyrics	Music	Length
1.	"Feel so real"	Toshinobu Kubota	Toshinobu Kubota	1:46
2.	"Dai Bora Of Life (Large Mullet of Life)"	Toshinobu Kubota	Toshinobu Kubota	4:37
3.	"Tell me why (Kono Koi No Yukue) (Tell Me Why (Whereabouts of This Love))"	Brother Tom	Toshinobu Kubota	5:49
4.	"Mama Udongo (Mabuta No Naka Ni) (Mama Udongo (In Eyelid))"	Toshinobu Kubota	Toshinobu Kubota	6:33
5.	"Be Wanabee"	Toshinobu Kubota	Toshinobu Kubota	5:24
6.	"Bonga Wanga (featuring Lynn Davis)"	Toshinobu Kubota	Toshinobu Kubota	1:56
7.	"Shoot the Hoop!"	Toshinobu Kubota	Yoichiro Kakizaki	4:39
8.	"Love Under the Moon"	Toshinobu Kubota	Toshinobu Kubota	6:12
9.	"Something's Comin' On"	Toshinobu Kubota	Toshinobu Kubota	2:51
10.	"Mixed Nuts"	Toshinobu Kubota	Toshinobu Kubota	6:30
11.	"Yasou (Virtual Night)"	Toshinobu Kubota	Toshinobu Kubota	6:57
12.	"No More Rain"	Toshinobu Kubota	Toshinobu Kubota	4:20
13.	"Kimi Ni Aitai (Want to Meet You)"	Toshinobu Kubota	Toshinobu Kubota	4:52
14.	"Bonga Wanga (Reprise) (featuring Lynn Davis)"	Toshinobu Kubota	Toshinobu Kubota	2:05
Total length:				64:24

== Personnel ==
- Backing Vocals – 501, Fonzi Thornton, Lynn Davis, Michelle Cobbs, Tawatha Agee, Toshinobu Kubota, Yoichiro Kakizaki
- Bass – Bootsy Collins, Tom Barney, Tracy Wormworth
- Drums – Anton Fig, William House
- Engineer – Bruce Miller, Bruce Buchanan, Bruce Calder, Gerard Julien, James Kuoriak, Lolly Grodner, Mike Fossenkemper, Rich July, Susan Morrison
- Engineer [Mastering] – Ted Jensen
- Engineer [Technical] – Bruce Manning, Leticia Mulzac, Robin Thomas
- Executive Producer – Hitoshi Ishitani, Yasohachi Itoh
- Guitar – Bootsy Collins, Charlie Singleton, Chris Udell, Randy Bowland, William Patterson
- Keyboards, Programmed By – Yoichiro Kakizaki
- Lyrics By – Brother Tom, Toshinobu Kubota
- Mixed By – Bruce Miller, Larry Fergusson
- Music By – Toshinobu Kubota, Yoichiro Kakizaki
- Orchestrated By – Toshinobu Kubota, Yoichiro Kakizaki
- Percussion – Bashiri Johnson, Don Alias
- Producer – Toshinobu Kubota
- Programmed By [Synclavier] – John Mahoney, Laura Janisse

== Charts ==
=== Oricon Sales Chart ===
Release	Chart	Peak position	Sales total
July 15, 1990	Oricon Weekly Chart	1	1,000,000+
July 15, 1990	Oricon Yearly Album Chart	8	1,000,000+

== See also ==
- 1990 in Japanese music
