= Kiss My Thang: Toshinobu Kubota's Selection =

Compilation album by Toshinobu Kubota
- Released: December 1, 1990
- Genres: Pop, R&B
- Label: Sony Music Entertainment Japan
- Producers: Hidenori Taga (exec. producer), Hiroshi Inagaki (exec. producer), Toshinobu Kubota, Hitoshi Ishitani, Tatsufumi Inaba

Toshinobu Kubota chronology
The Baddest (1989)	Kiss My Thang: Toshinobu Kubota's Selection (1990)	Kubojah: Parallel World I (1991)

Kiss My Thang: Toshinobu Kubota's Selection is a compilation album released by Toshinobu Kubota on December 1, 1990. The album consists of Kubota's favorite songs by his favorite artists. The album is now out of print.

== Track listing ==
1. "Sexual Healing" (performed by Marvin Gaye)
2. "Just Got Paid" (performed by Johnny Kemp)
3. "Got To Be Real" (performed by Cheryl Lynn)
4. "Between The Sheets" (performed by The Isley Brothers)
5. "Couldn't Get To Sleep Last Night" (performed by Blue Magic)
6. "Child's Play (Part 3)" (performed by Full Force)
7. "Me Myself And I" (performed by De La Soul)
8. "Never Knew Love Like This" (performed by Alexander O'Neal)
9. "1st One 2 The Egg Wins (The Human Race)" (performed by Bootsy Collins)
10. "Fantasy" (performed by Earth, Wind & Fire)
11. "Just Call My Name" (performed by Alyson Williams)
12. "You Are My Everything" (performed by Surface)
13. "Just The Two Of Us" (performed by Bill Withers)
14. "I've Had Enough" (performed by Earth, Wind & Fire)
15. "Wrath Of My Madness" (performed by Queen Latifah)
16. "Me And Mrs. Jones" (performed by Billy Paul)

== See also ==
- 1990 in Japanese music
