= The Baddest III =

Studio album by Toshinobu Kubota
- Released: December 4, 2002
- Genre: pop, R&B
- Label: Sony Music Entertainment Japan

Toshinobu Kubota chronology
The Baddest: Only For Lovers In The Mood (2002)	The Baddest III (2002)	Time to Share (2004)

The Baddest III is a compilation released by Japanese singer Toshinobu Kubota, on December 4, 2002. The album charted at number 3 on the Oricon Weekly Albums chart and stay on the charts for a total of eighteen weeks. The album also sold over 316,000 units in Japan.

== Track listing ==
1. La La La Love Song (featuring Naomi Campbell)
2. The Sound of Carnival (Brand New Mix)
3. Nice & EZ
4. Cymbals
5. Candy Rain
6. Soul Bangin'
7. Ahhhhh! (Northern Lights Version)
8. What's The Wonder?
9. What Are You Looking At?
10. Always Remain
11. Summer Eyes
12. Never Turn Back (featuring Pras)
13. Messengers' Rhyme (Rakushow, It's Your Show!) (The Baddest Bottom Mix)
14. Polyrhythm
15. Yoru Ni Dakarete (A Night In Afro Blue)
16. Free Your Soul (KC's Bee-Mellow Remix)

== Charts ==
=== Oricon Sales Chart ===
Release	Chart	Peak position	Sales total
December 4, 2002	Oricon Weekly Chart	28	316,000+
