= Neptune (Toshinobu Kubota album) =

Studio album by Toshinobu Kubota
- Released: July 1, 1992
- Recorded: 1991–1992; Electric Lady Studios NYC
- Genre: R&B, pop, dance, dance-pop
- Length: 57:10
- Label: Sony Music Entertainment Japan
- Producer: Toshinobu Kubota, Yoichiro Kakizaki

Toshinobu Kubota chronology
Kubojah: Parallel World I (1991)	Neptune (1992)	The Baddest II (1993)

Neptune is the sixth studio album by Japanese singer Toshinobu Kubota, released on July 1, 1992. The album charted at number 3 on the Oricon Monthly Albums chart and remained on the charts for total of 13 weeks. The album sold a total of 484,000 units, reaching double platinum certification.

== Track listing ==
1. Mayonaka no Taiyō (真夜中の太陽, "Midnight Sun")
2. "To the Limit"
3. "Adeus Meu Amor"
4. Toranpetto Fukinagara (トランペット吹きながら, "Playing a Trumpet")
5. Natsu no Shigosen (夏の子午線, "Summer Meridian")
6. Sweet Dreams: Sotto Oyasumi (Ｓｗｅｅｔ Ｄｒｅａｍｓ～そっとおやすみ～)
7. "Let's Get a Groove: Yo! Hips"
8. "Our Masterpiece"
9. "Pump Up Your Gold"
10. "Get Six"
11. Chikai (誓い, "Oath")

== Personnel ==
- Artwork (art direction & design): Ryuzoh Nagasex (Sony Records)
- Artwork (type setting): Art Press
- Co-producer: Andres Levin (tracks 1, 4, 10), Camus Celli (tracks 1, 4, 10), Jeff Bova (tracks: 9), Yoichiro Kakizaki (tracks 2, 3, 5 to 8, 11)
- Engineer: Stephen Seltzer
- Engineer (assistant): Jenni Bette, Shannon Carr
- Engineer (mastering): Ted Jensen
- Executive producer: Hidenori Taga (Kitty), Yasohachi "88" Itoh (Sony Records)
- Lyrics: Masumi Kawamura (tracks 2, 5), Toshinobu Kubota (tracks 1, 3, 4, 6 to 11)
- Mixing: Larry Alexander, Stephen Seltzer
- Music: Yoichiro Kakizaki (track 9)
- Photography: Yoshiaki Sugiyama
- Photography (digital): Foton
- Production, music: Toshinobu Kubota

== Funkin' On Neptune Tour ==
Staged from June 26 to October 1, 1992, and included songs from the album Neptune, as well as the songs "Time (Shower ni Utarete)" and "Eien no Tsubasa" from his previous album Groovin'.

The opening act for the June 26 show was Yoshie Shimizu.

=== Set list ===
1. Let's Get a Groove: Yo! Hips
2. Natsu no Shigosen
3. To the Limit
4. Our Masterpiece
5. Eien no Tsubasa
6. Mayonaka no Taiyō
7. Time (Shower ni Utarete)

=== Personnel ===
Band

- Bass: Dale Sanders
- Guitar: Ichiro Haneda
- Keyboard: Yoichiro Kakizaki, Takuo Sugiyama
- Percussion: Obao Nakajima
- Other instruments: Hiroshi Araki, Kazufumi Suzuki

Background vocalists

- Dale Sanders
- Rinko Urashima
- Yoko Takahashi
