= Lisa Ellis (executive producer) =

American businessperson and financier

- Born: 1970 (age 55–56)
- Education: University of Maryland; Harvard Business School
- Occupations: Business executive, entrepreneur, executive producer
- Years active: 1990s-present
- Employer(s): Provenance Ventures, Provenance Media, Box 388 Entertainment Management
- Website: lisaellisonline.com

Lisa Ellis (born 1970) is an American businessperson and financier. Starting her career in management roles at the Pepsi-Cola Company, Reebok International, and Sony Music's Columbia Records, in 2003 she became Sony Music's vice president of strategic marketing and music licensing. She became president of Sony Urban Music in 2005 and executive vice president of Sony Music Label Group in 2006. She then became an operating partner at the investment firm Fireman Capital Partners in 2009, also serving on the board of directors for several Fireman portfolio companies. Ellis currently operates Box Three Eight Eight Management and is the managing partner of Provenance Ventures, a holding company for Provenance Media and Provenance Films. From 2006 until 2009 she was named to Billboard's “Most Powerful [20] Women In Music” list, ranking 3 in 2006 and 2007.

== Early life and education ==
Lisa Ellis was born in 1970. She grew up in Howard County, Maryland and outside Washington, D.C. As a teenager she competed in the hunter-jumper and equitation disciplines, and stopped riding at age 17 after suffering from a fall. She graduated from the University of Maryland with a Bachelor of Science degree in business administration. She graduated from the general management program at Harvard University Business School in 2011.

== Career ==
=== Early corporate positions ===
Early in her career Ellis worked with Earl G. Graves as a marketing manager at the Pepsi-Cola Company. She was then hired by CBS/Infinity Radio in Washington, D.C., where she did promotional and event marketing as the CBS Radio promotions and event marketing manager. After CBS she joined Reebok International, serving as Reebok's sports marketing manager. While working on the MTV Awards with Reebok in 1995, she met an executive from Columbia Records in Manhattan’s Bryant Park. Columbia hired her one month later as a local promotion manager, and she afterwards held positions at Columbia such as the west coast vice president of national promotion, and then moving back to New York as senior VP of R&B/rhythm-crossover promotion.

=== Sony management ===
In 2003 she was appointed senior VP of strategic marketing and music licensing at Columbia’s parent company Sony Music, where she worked with Sony subsidiaries such as Columbia, Epic Records, Sony Music Nashville, Legacy Recordings, and Sony ATV Publishing. Also working with Sony acts such as Lauryn Hill, Destiny's Child, ACDC, and Beyonce. People reports that she signed John Legend to Columbia Records, and brought Prince back to Columbia. Other roles included overseeing Sony’s dance department, street marketing team and Rap Mix Show Department.

After a restructuring of Sony Music, March 2004 she became general manager of Sony Urban Music, a newly created position with Ellis reporting to Don Ienner in New York. According to Billboard, she "declared that strong A&R and breaking developing acts were at the heart of her agenda." As general manager she oversaw the unit's day-to-day operations and worked on Urban Music matters with Sony's US labels such as Columbia and Epic. Among other projects, she was an executive producer on the 2004 album Time to Share by Toshi Kubota. Sony promoted Ellis from general manager to division president in December 2005.

In December 2006, Ellis was appointed executive vice president of Sony Music Label Group. Working with chairman Rob Stringer "in all aspects of the group's activities,” she was given company projects such as overseeing Sony Music's green initiatives and packaging initiatives, and was tasked with focusing on digital growth. In her first year in the position, she secured an agreement with Verizon and Motorola for the digital release of AC/DC's catalog. Continuing to work with artists such as Prince, John Legend, Terrence Howard, Alice Smith, and Maxwell, she also worked with Three Six Mafia and Aaron Rosenberg to create the 2007 MTV production Adventures in Hollyhood.

=== Fireman Capital and Provenance ===
Ellis left Sony after deciding not to renew her contract in 2009, instead becoming a founding operating partner that January in two funds at Fireman Capital Partners. With Fireman she focused on "music, entertainment and consumer products investments" for the business in the portfolio, advising Fireman Capital which included serving on the boards of a few of the Fireman companies. Fireman Capital backed Ellis in various entertainment ventures. On March 5, 2009 Ellis was a panelist on 'Trends in Venture Capital and Private Equity' at the Billboard Music & Money Symposium. By 2012, she was operating the company Box Three Eight Eight Management, representing artists such as Ciara. Beyond her role as a principle of Box Three Eight Eight, Inc., she is managing partner of the venture firm Provenance, which holds the companies Provenance Media and Provenance Films.

== Recognition ==
She received the Radio Music Award for crossover executive of the year in 2001. In 2005 Black Enterprise named her to its "Hot List: America's Most Powerful Players Under 40," and in 2007 Ebony included her in the “Ebony Power 150.” In 2005, Billboard named her one of the most powerful 24 women in music. Starting in 2006 she was named to Billboard's “Most Powerful [20] Women In Music” list for four consecutive years, ranking 3 in 2006, 3 in 2007, and 9 in 2008. She was ranked 50 on the "Most Creative People" list put out in 2009 by Fast Company, and Black Enterprise included her in its 2011 ”Top Women Executives Behind the Scenes" feature. Pink magazine also named her one of its Top 15 Women in Business.

== Personal life ==
An equestrian, Ellis is a member of the United States Equestrian Federation. She is a term member at the Council on Foreign Relations.

Ellis has been involved in various civic projects, including the restoration of the Howard Theatre in Washington, D.C.
