= Such a Funky Thang! =

Studio album by Toshinobu Kubota
- Released: September 30, 1988
- Recorded: 1987–1988
- Genres: City pop; J-pop; funk; go-go; new jack swing; old-school hip hop
- Length: 61:54
- Label: Sony Music Entertainment Japan

Toshinobu Kubota chronology
Groovin' (1987)	Such a Funky Thang! (1988)	The Baddest (1989)

Such a Funky Thang! is the third album of Japanese singer Toshinobu Kubota, released on September 30, 1988. The album peaked at number one and was certified million. According to Sony Music Entertainment Japan's annual report, the album was Kubota's highest-selling album to date as well as the best-selling album in 1988 for CBS/Sony Group.

== Release and promotion ==
The album was released on September 30, 1988 by Sony Music Entertainment Japan who also distributed the album exclusively in Japan. The album was released in compact disc, LP, and 12-inch vinyl formats. He headlined his own concert tour called "I Need Your Funky Thang!" in Japan.

=== Singles ===
In November 1988, the album's first single "Dance If You Want It" was released, which charted at number 3 on the Oricon Singles. The single also sold over 151,630 copies in Japan, making it gold-status by the RIAJ. The second single "Indigo Waltz" was released in January 1989, which sold over 102,270 copies in Japan, becoming certified gold-status by the RIAJ. In March 1989, the third single "High Roller" was released and charted at number 11 on the Oricon Singles chart.

== Track listing ==
1. Dance If You Want It
2. High Roller
3. Love Reborn
4. Yo Bro!
5. Merry Merry Miracle
6. Such A Funky Thang!
7. Gone Gone Gone
8. すべての山に登れ
9. Boxer
10. Indigo Waltz
11. Drunkard Terry
12. 覚えていた夢 (I Remember A Dream)
13. Such A Funky Thang! (Reprise)

== See also ==
- 1988 in Japanese music
