= For Real? =

Studio album by Toshinobu Kubota
- Released: March 1, 2006
- Recorded: 2005
- Genre: R&B, pop, soul
- Length: 58:29
- Label: Sony Music Entertainment Japan
- Producer: Toshinobu Kubota

Toshinobu Kubota chronology
Time to Share (2004)	For Real? (2006)	Timeless Fly (2010)

For Real? is the 14th studio album of Japanese singer Toshinobu Kubota, released on March 1, 2006. The album charted at number 13 on the Oricon Albums chart and remained on the charts for total of 9 weeks. The album sold over 33,000 units in Japan.

It was released on Sony BMG.

A live version was sold in August 2007.

== Track listing ==
1. "Vibe For Real" (Foreplay)
2. "Dr.Party"
3. "Riding to the Sight"
4. "U Drive Me Crazy"
5. "A Love Story" (TV Mix)
6. "It's Time to Smile"
7. "Kimi Ni Au Made Ha"
8. "Slow Jam Lovin'"
9. "Vibe For Real (The Play)"
10. "Kimi No Soba Ni"
11. "Sign of Love" (Soul Response Version)
12. "Club Happiness feat. KM-MARKIT" (Brothahood Version)
13. "Sukima"
