= Nothing But Your Love =

Studio album by Toshi Kubota
- Released: July 25, 2000
- Recorded: 1998–2000
- Genre: R&B, soul, funk, psychedelic soul
- Length: 51:28
- Label: Sony Music Entertainment Japan, Epic Records
- Producer: Toshinobu Kubota (exec. producer), The Roots, Soulshock & Karlin, Joe "The Butcher" Nicolo, Raphael Saadiq, Camus Celli, Trackmasters

Toshi Kubota chronology
The Best of Kubota Toshinobu (1999)	Nothing But Your Love (2000)	As One (2000)

Nothing But Your Love is the tenth studio album of Japanese singer, Toshinobu Kubota (credited under Toshi Kubota), released on June 28, 2000.

== Background ==
On June 21, 2000, Kubota released the single "Nothing But Your Love" which charted at number 97. In March 2001, "Masquerade" was released as the second single. In the same year, Kubota began the "Nothing But As One Tour". The album reached number 7 on the Oricon Albums chart and remained on the chart for a total of four weeks. It is also noted that this is Kubota's second English-language album.

== Track listing ==
1. "Nothing But Your Love" (Toshi Kubota)
2. "Masquerade" (Toshi Kubota, Mercedes Martinez, Tracey Moore)
3. "Never Turn Back" (featuring Pras) (Toshi Kubota, Joi Cardwell, Luigi Creatore, Hugo Peretti, George David Weiss)
4. "Body Bounce" (Toshi Kubota, Joi Cardwell, Roger Troutman)
5. "Someday" (Toshi Kubota, Angie Stone)
6. "Till She Comes" (Toshi Kubota, Mercedes Martinez, Tracey Moore)
7. "Pu Pu" (Raphael Saadiq, Angie Stone, Toshi Kubota)
8. "Nothing But Your Love" (Interlude) (Toshi Kubota)
9. "Sha-Ba-Da-Bu-Doo" (Go With The Flow) (Camus Celli Mix) (Toshi Kubota, Joi Cardwell, Williams, Nichols)
10. "Shame" (Raphael Saadiq, Angie Stone, Toshi Kubota)
11. I Just Can't Get Enough" (Toshi Kubota, Joi Cardwell, Philip White, Carsten Schack, Kenneth Karlin)
12. "It's Over" (featuring Punchline & Wordsworth) (Jean-Claude Olivier, Samuel Barnes, Charmelle Cofield)
13. "Gently" (Diane Warren)

== Personnel ==
- Art Direction: Ian Cuttler
- Bass: Leonard Hubbard, Carl James
- Drums: Ralph Rolle
- Drum Programming: Camus Mare Celli, Soulshock
- Editing: Bill Malina
- Engineer: Camus Mare Celli, Jason Goldstein, Chaz Harper, Dave Ivory, Manny Marroquin, James Murray, Joe Nicolo, Dave O'Donnell, Jon Smeltz
- Engineer Assistant: Jim Caruana, Victor McCoy
- Keyboards: Jeff Bova, Camus Mare Celli, Soulshock, Bette Sussman
- Mastering: Vladimir Meller
- Mixing: Camus Mare Celli, Ben Garrison, Manny Marroquin, Joe Nicolo, Axel Niehaus, Dexter Simmons
- String Arrangements: Jeff Bova
- Synthesizer: Jeff Bova
- Turntables: Steve D.

== Sales ==
Region	Certification	Certified units/sales
Japan	—	500,000
