= Kubojah: Parallel World I =

Studio album by Toshinobu Kubota
- Released: September 21, 1991
- Recorded: 1991
- Genre: Reggae
- Length: 53:24
- Label: Sony Music Entertainment Japan
- Producer: Hitoshi Ishitani (exex. producer), Yasohachi Itoh (exec. producer), Toshinobu Kubota

Toshinobu Kubota chronology
Kiss My Thang: Toshinobu Kubota's Selection (1990)	Kubojah: Parallel World I (1991)	Neptune (1992)

Singles from Kubojah: Parallel World I
- 1. "Keep On Jammin'" Released: September 1, 1991; 2. "Honey B" Released: September 1, 1991; 3. "Amaoto" Released: November 1, 1991; 4. "Love Like A Rastaman" Released: November 1, 1991

Kubojah: Parallel World I is the fifth studio album of Japanese singer Toshinobu Kubota, released on September 21, 1991.

== Background ==
On September 9, 1991, Kubota released the lead singles "Honey B" and "Keep On Jammin'", which chart at number 15 on the Oricon Weekly Singles chart. On September 21, 1991, Kubota released Kubojah: Parallel World I. The album became Kubota's fourth album to reach number 1 on the Oricon Weekly Albums chart. On November 1, 1991, Amaoto was released the third single and chart at number 34 on the Oricon Weekly Singles chart. As of February 2012, Kubojah: Parallel World I has sold over 571,000 copies in Japan, reaching double platinum certification.

== Track listing ==
1. "Keep On Jammin'"
2. "Amaoto" (Sound of Rain)
3. "Honey B"
4. "Love Like A Rastaman"
5. "Otokotachi No Uta" (Poetry of men ~ My Yout ~)
6. "Telephoto"
7. "Just the 2 of Us" (featuring Caron Wheeler)
8. "You Were Mine (Kubojah Version)"
9. "Kami Naru Mono To Bara No Toge" (Roses and Thorns of the Divine)
10. "Kitakaze To Taiyou (Bro. Hussein & Bro. Bush)" (The North Wind and The Sun (Bro. Hussein & Bro. Bush))
11. "Jamaica (Kono Tamashii No Yasuragi)" (Jamaica (Peace of Soul))

== Personnel ==
- Arranged by Toshinobu Kubota
- Arranged by [Background Vocals Co-arranged] – Caron Wheeler, Yoichiro Kakizaki
- Backing vocals – Caron Wheeler, Chris Cameron, Fonzi Thornton, Robin Clark, Tawatha Agee, Toshinobu Kubota, Yoichiro Kakizaki
- Co-producer – Chris Cameron, Jeff Bova, Yoichiro Kakizaki
- Engineer [Assistant] – Shannon Carr
- Engineer [Mastering] – Ted Jensen
- Engineer, Mixed by Larry Alexander
- Percussion – Crusher Bennett, Carol Steele, Gerardo Velez
- Producer – Toshinobu Kubota
- Synthesizer [Programming and performance] – Chris Cameron, Jeff Bova, Yoichiro Kakizaki
- Vocal [African "hunma"] – Chris Cameron, Larry Alexander, Toshinobu Kubota, Yasuhiro "Jumbo" Sato

== Charts ==
=== Oricon Sales Chart ===
Release	Chart
Oricon Weekly Albums Chart	1
Oricon Yearly Albums Chart	28
