= The Baddest: Only for Lovers in the Mood =

The Baddest: Only For Lovers In The Mood

Compilation album by Toshinobu Kubota
- Released: July 24, 2002
- Genre: R&B
- Label: Sony Music Entertainment Japan

Toshinobu Kubota chronology
United Flow (2002)	The Baddest: Only For Lovers In The Mood (2002)	Time to Share (2004)

The Baddest: Only For Lovers In The Mood is a compilation by Japanese singer Toshinobu Kubota. The album was released on July 24, 2002 on Sony Music Entertainment. Unlike its predecessors, the album only features love songs, excluding the Kubota's hit singles from the album. The album charted at number 22 on the Oricon Weekly Albums chart and remained on the charts for two weeks.

== Track listing ==
1. No Lights... Candle Light (United Groove Version)
2. Too Lite 2 Do
3. Angel
4. 6 to 8
5. Silk No Ai Ga Hosikkute
6. Till She Comes
7. In The Mood (Original performance by The Whispers)
8. Love Reborn (KC's What'cha Gonna Do? Remix)
9. Shooting Star
10. Jam With Me
11. Let's Make One Shadow
12. Get It Together
13. Just the Two of Us (Smooth R&B Remix) (Duet with Caron Wheeler)
