= Bumpin' Voyage =

Studio album by Toshinobu Kubota
- Released: January 28, 1995
- Recorded: 1993–1994
- Genres: R&B, pop
- Length: 54:36
- Label: Sony Music Entertainment Japan
- Producers: Toshinobu Kubota, Yoichiro Kakizaki

Toshinobu Kubota chronology
The Baddest II (1993)	Bumpin' Voyage (1995)	Sunshine, Moonlight (1995)

Singles from Bumpin' Voyage
- 1. "Yoru ni Dakarete (A Night in Afro Blue)" Released: November 2, 1994; 2. "Za-Ku-Za-Ku Digame" Released: December 1, 1994; 3. "Sunshine, Moonlight" Released: December 1, 1994

Bumpin' Voyage is the seventh studio album of Japanese singer Toshinobu Kubota, released on January 28, 1995. The album charted at number 1 on the Oricon Albums chart and remained on the charts for total of 12 weeks. The album sold a total of 600,000 units, reaching double platinum certification. In September 1995, Kubota re-recorded most of the album into English language and released the material on his eighth studio album Sunshine, Moonlight.

== Track listing ==
1. "PaLaLeYa (Sayonara)"
2. "Sunshine, Moonlight"
3. "Kimi Wa Nani O Miteru"
4. "Za-Ku-Za-Ku Digame"
5. "D.J. "Fonk" "
6. "Too Lite 2 Do "
7. "Not Yet!"
8. "6 to 8"
9. "Dive Into The Base"
10. "Sagashiteta Wasuremono"
11. "Yoru Ni Dakarete (A Night In Afro Blue)"

== Personnel ==
- Arranged By – Yoichiro Kakizaki
- Backing Vocals – Andres Levin, Andricka Hall, Audrey Wheeler, Camus Celli, Fonzi Thornton, John James, Joi Cardwell, Ralph Rolle, Robin Clark, Tawatha Agee, Toshinobu Kubota
- Bass – Victor Bailey, Wayne Pedzwater
- Co-producer – Andres Levin, Andy Marvel, Camus Celli, Jeff Bova, Yoichiro Kakizaki
- Engineer [Assistant] – Ben Arrindell, Chris Theis, Dan Ricci, Donal Bray, John Seymour, Martin Czembor, Mike Fisher, Tim Donovan
- Engineer [Recording] – David O'Donnell, Ray Bardani, Steve McLaughlin
- Guitar – Jeff Mironov, Nile Rodgers, Randy Bowland
- Keyboards [Additional] – Eric Cody, Kitaro Nakamura
- Lyrics By – Man Izawa, Toshinobu Kubota
- Music By – Toshinobu Kubota, Yoichiro Kakizaki
- Producer – Toshinobu Kubota
- Programmed By – Andres Levin, Andy Marvel, Camus Celli, Jeff Bova, Yoichiro Kakizaki

== Charts ==
=== Oricon Sales Chart ===
Release	Chart
Oricon Weekly Albums Chart	3
Oricon Yearly Albums Chart	36
