= As One (Toshinobu Kubota album) =

Studio album by Toshinobu Kubota
- Released: September 27, 2000
- Recorded: 1998–2000
- Genres: R&B, soul
- Length: 57:01
- Label: Sony Music Entertainment Japan
- Producer: Toshinobu Kubota

Toshinobu Kubota chronology
| Nothing But Your Love (2000) | As One (2000) | United Flow (2002) |

As One is the eleventh studio album of Japanese singer Toshinobu Kubota, released on September 27, 2000.

== Release and promotion ==
On September 27, 2000, Kubota released "As One" on the recording label Sony Music Entertainment Japan. The album debuted at number 5 on the Oricon Albums chart and remained on the chart for a total of eight weeks. The album sold over 148,000 units in Japan.

=== Singles ===
"The Sound of Carnival" was released July 28, 1999. The song peaked at the number nine position on the Oricon Weekly Singles chart. The second single "Polyrhythm" was released on August 30, 2000. The song also charted at number 22 on the Oricon Weekly Singles chart. In November 2000, the third single "Always Remain" was released. The song peaked at number 66 on the Oricon Weekly Singles chart.

=== Tour ===
In November 2000, Kubota began the Nothing But As One Tour. The tour scheduled thirty-four performance dates.

== Track listing ==
1. "Introduction"
2. "As One"
3. "Bossa Groove"
4. "My Heart, Homeless Heart"
5. "His Sugar"
6. "Always Remain"
7. "Interlude"
8. "Maido Obrigado"
9. "Let's Make One Shadow"
10. "The Sound of Carnival"
11. "Party People In The Planet"
12. "Shooting Star"
13. "Polyrhythm"
