= The Baddest II =

Compilation album by Toshinobu Kubota
- Released: September 22, 1993
- Recorded: 1990–1992
- Genre: Pop, reggae, funk, go-go, R&B
- Length: 76:43
- Label: Sony Music Entertainment Japan

Toshinobu Kubota chronology
| Neptune (1992) | The Baddest II (1993) | Bumpin' Voyage (1995) |

The Baddest II is a compilation album of Japanese singer Toshinobu Kubota. The album released on September 22, 1993, summing up various singles from Kubota. The album peaked at number one and spent twenty-three weeks on the Oricon Weekly Albums chart. The album became certified triple platinum, selling over 791,000 copies in Japan.

== Track listing ==
1. "Yume with You (A Cappella)"
2. "Dance If You Want It"
3. "Give You My Love" (featuring Lynn Davis)
4. "Love Reborn"
5. "Amaoto"
6. "Be Wannabee"
7. "High Roller"
8. "I Want to See You"
9. "Indigo Waltz '93 (Dedicate To Michael C. Hoffman)" (featuring Lynn Davis)
10. "Mama Udongo"
11. "Keep On Jammin'"
12. "Orquesta Futari"
13. "Yume With You"
14. "Moving Target"
15. "Forever Yours" (Duet With Alyson Williams)
