= Groovin' (Toshinobu Kubota album) =

Studio album by Toshinobu Kubota
- Released: April 22, 1987
- Recorded: 1986
- Genre: Pop, old skool
- Length: 46:58
- Label: Sony Music Entertainment Japan

Toshinobu Kubota chronology
Shake It Paradise (1986)	Groovin' (1987)	Such A Funky Thang! (1988)

Groovin' is the second album by Japanese singer Toshinobu Kubota, released on April 22, 1987. The album peaked at number 33 on the Oricon Album charts, and sold over a million copies, becoming a certified Million. Following the release of the album, Kubota went on "Keep On Dancing Tour", and later released the concert DVD Keep On Dancing.

== Track listing ==
1. Psychic Beat
2. Kitakaze to Taiyō (北風と太陽, "North Wind and the Sun")
3. Place
4. Randy Candy
5. Lady Suicide
6. Ichizu na Yoru, Mukizu na Asa (一途な夜、無傷な朝, "Determined Night, Unharmed Morning")
7. Daiyamondo no Inutachi (ダイヤモンドの犬たち, "Diamond Dogs")
8. Hakujō Love Machine (薄情Love Machine, "Cruel Love machine")
9. Eien no Tsubasa (永遠の翼, "Eternal Wings")
10. Visions
11. Hachibanme no Niji no Iro (八番目の虹の色, "Eighth Color of the Rainbow")

== See also ==
- 1987 in Japanese music
