= United Flow =

Studio album by Toshinobu Kubota
- Released: April 10, 2002
- Recorded: 2001
- Genres: R&B, soul
- Labels: Columbia Records, Sony Music Entertainment Japan
- Producer: Toshinobu Kubota

Toshinobu Kubota chronology
As One (2000)	United Flow (2002)	Time to Share (2004)

United Flow is the twelfth studio album by Japanese singer Toshinobu Kubota, released on April 10, 2002. The album sold over 68,000 units in Japan.

== Release and the charts ==
It was released in 2002 on Columbia Records.

It charted high on the Billboard chart in Japan when it came out, reaching number 6 on the albums chart. The album charted at number 9 on the Oricon Albums chart and remained on the chart for five weeks.

== Track listing ==
1. "United Flow (Foreplay)"
2. "Go"
3. "無常"
4. "Do Me Baby"
5. "Respect (This & That) (Extended Funky Jam Version)"
6. "#My Bad"
7. "Heaven?"
8. "United Flow (Replay)"
9. "Because of U"
10. "Free Your Soul"
11. "Moonstruck"
12. "Candy Rain"
13. "In Your Flow (Eternal Flow Version)"
