= The Baddest (Toshinobu Kubota album) =

Compilation album by Toshinobu Kubota
- Released: September 30, 1989
- Recorded: 1986–1989
- Genre: Pop, old skool, funk, go-go, R&B
- Length: 60:00
- Label: Sony Music Entertainment Japan

Toshinobu Kubota chronology
Such A Funky Thang! (1988)	The Baddest (1989)	Bonga Wanga (1990)

The Baddest is the first compilation album of Japanese singer Toshinobu Kubota, released on October 8, 1989. The album peaked at number one and was certified million.

On February 9, 2009, Sony Music Entertainment Records released Blu-spec CD Limited Edition of the album .

== Track listing ==
No.	Title	Lyrics	Music	Length
1.	"Time (Shower ni Utarete) (Time (Been struck shower))"	Masumi Kawamura	Sugiyama Takuo, Toshinobu Kubota, ANOTHER STAR	7:01
2.	"Ryuusei no Sadoru (Saddle of Meteor)"	Masumi Kawamura	Toshinobu Kubota, Satoshi Takebe	4:26
3.	"Oh, What A Night!"	Masumi Kawamura	Toshinobu Kubota, Sugiyama Takuo, Mother Earth, Rod Antoon	4:18
4.	"Missing"	Toshinobu Kubota	Toshinobu Kubota, Sugiyama Takuo	4:53
5.	"You were mine"	Masumi Kawamura	Toshinobu Kubota, Ichiro Hata, Sugiyama Takuo, Mother Earth	4:47
6.	"Ichizu na Yoru, Mukizu na Asa (Determined Night, Unharmed Morning)"	Masumi Kawamura	Toshinobu Kubota, Sugiyama Takuo	4:11
7.	"Goddess -Atrashii Megami- (New goddess Goddess)"	Masumi Kawamura	Toshinobu Kubota, Sugiyama Takuo	4:43
8.	"Psychic Beat"	Masumi Kawamura	Toshinobu Kubota, Sugiyama Takuo, Mother Earth	4:34
9.	"Eien no Tsubasa (Wings of Forever)"	Toshinobu Kubota	Toshinobu Kubota, Sugiyama Takuo, Mother Earth	4:56
10.	"Olympic (Wa Hi No Kuruma) (Olympic is fiery chariot)"	Masumi Kawamura	Toshinobu Kubota, Sugiyama Takuo, Ichiro Hata	4:14
11.	"Tawawa Hitto Pareido (Tawawa Hit Parade)"	Masumi Kawamura	Toshinobu Kubota, Mother Earth	6:47
12.	"Cry On Your Smile"	Masumi Kawamura	Toshinobu Kubota, Sugiyama Takuo	5:10
Total length:				60:05

== See also ==
- 1989 in Japanese music
