= Time to Share =

Studio album by Toshinobu Kubota
- Released: September 21, 2004
- Recorded: 2003–2004
- Genre: R&B, soul, funk, neo soul
- Length: 46:24
- Label: Sony Music Entertainment Japan, Epic Records, Sony Urban Music
- Producer: Toshinobu Kubota (exec. producer), Kaz Hayashida (exec. producer), Lisa Ellis (exec. producer), L. Londell McMillan (exec. producer), Carvin Haggins & Ivan "Orthodox" Barias, Buckwild, Ali Shaheed Muhammad, Jonathan D. Richmond, Ralph Rolle, Angie Stone

Toshinobu Kubota chronology
United Flow (2002)	Time to Share (2004)	For Real? (2006)

Time to Share is the thirteenth album from Japanese musician Toshinobu Kubota, released on September 21, 2004, under his alias "Toshi." It was Kubota's third English album.

== Background and recording ==
Time so Share was recorded at a multitude of locations, including the New York studios like Battery Studios, Glowy Studios, Jammin' Downtown Studios, Quad Recording Studios, and Stash House Studios. It was also recorded at Westlake Studios in Los Angeles, and Home Cookin in Philadelphia. Toshi co-wrote all the songs on the album, which has collaborations with rapper Mos Def and singer Angie Stone. Although uncredited as a featured vocalist, Stone sings background vocals on the songs "Beating My Heart," "Breaking Through," "It's Time," and "Shadows of Your Love." Sy Smith appears on the song "Neva Satisfied," and Felicia "Fenix" Graham appears on the song "Hope You'll Be Well."

== Release and charts ==
By September 11, 2004, the first single "Breaking Through" had been released to R&B radio, and Epic had placed it on BET and MTV2. The album was released by SMI Records Inc on September 21, 2004, under his alias "Toshi." Epic/Sony Urban Music also released the album on September 21, 2004.

The album charted at number 25 on the Oricon Albums chart. The album featured the singles "Breaking Through" and "Shadows of Your Love." In the same year, Kubota appeared on the American television show Soul Train to promote the album, becoming the first Japanese singer to appear on the show. After the release of the album, Kubota toured with Angie Stone in 2005.

== Reception ==
Billboard called it "blissfully groove-drenched." Allmusic reviewed the album, and wrote that it "is another fine album [like Toshi's last], but... the material is too mature and laid-back to appeal to more than attentive contemporary R&B fans in their late twenties and thirties. And that's not a knock on the artist."

== Track listing ==
1. "Beating of My Heart"
2. "Living for Today" (feat. Mos Def)
3. "Breaking Through/Yaheat/Mybeat (Interlude, Pt. 1)"
4. "Hold Me Down" (feat. Angie Stone)
5. "Neva Satisfied"
6. "Shadows of Your Love"
7. "It's Time"
8. "'Cause You're So Bad"
9. "Hope You'll Be Well/Yaheat/Mybeat (Interlude, Pt. 2)"
10. "Voodoo Woman" (feat. Renee Neufville)

== Personnel ==
These are the credits:

- Gary Beech - Product Manager
- Mike Campbell - Guitar
- Matt Cappy - Trumpet
- Susanne Cerha - Art Direction, Design
- Lysa Cooper - Stylist
- Amil Dave - Production Coordination
- Tenita Dreher - Vocals (Background)
- Ken "Supa Engineer" Duro - Mixing
- Keith Fluitt - Vocals (Background)
- Larry Gold - String Arrangements
- Felicia Graham - Vocals (Background)
- Carvin "Ransum" Haggins - Engineer, Producer, Vocal Producer
- Carlos "DJ Smooth" Henderson - Composer and Bass
- Naoto Ikeda - Photography
- John James - Vocals (Background)
- Yusuke Katsuki - Grooming
- Yutaka Kawana - Assistant Engineer, Guitar
- Toshi Kubota - Drum Programming, Guitar, Keyboard Programming, Primary Artist, Producer, Programming, Vocal Arrangement, Vocal Producer, Vocals (Background)
- Jessica Kyle - Vocals (Background)
- Selan Lerner - Fender Rhodes, Keyboards, Soloist
- Magdaleno Martinez - Composer
- Mos Def (Dante Smith) - Composer, Guest Artist, Primary Artist
- Ali Shaheed Muhammad - Instrumentation, Producer, Programming
- Renee Neufville - Primary Artist, Vocals (Background)
- Jonathan D. Richmond - Instrumentation, Producer, Programming, Vocals (Background)
- Ralph Rolle - Drum Programming, Drums, Keyboard Programming, Poetry Reading, Producer, Vocal Director, Vocals (Background), Voices
- Francesco Romano - Guitar
- Amanda Rosamilia - A&R Assistance
- Sy Smith - Vocal Arrangement, Vocals (Background)
- Angie Stone - Guest Artist, Primary Artist, Producer, Vocals (Background)
- Diamond Stone - Vocals (Background)
- Third Eye - MC
- Thaddeus T. Tribbett - Bass
- Elisabeth Withers - Vocals (Background)
- Parris Bowens - Keyboards

=== Engineers ===
- Charles "Prince Charles" Alexander - Mixing
- Tim Donovan - Engineer, Mixing
- Serban Ghenea - Mixing
- Andre Netto - Assistant Engineer
- Tim Olmstead - Assistant Engineer
- Herb Powers - Mastering
- Jason Rankins - Assistant Engineer
- Alejandro Rodriguez - Assistant Engineer
- Andros Rodriguez - Assistant Engineer
- Rich Tapper - Assistant Engineer
- Miki Tsutsumi - Assistant Engineer
- Ray Wilson - Engineer

=== Producers ===
- Buck Wild - Producer
- Lisa Ellis - Executive Producer
- Kaz Hayashida - Executive Producer
- Toshi Rolle - Producer
- L. Londell McMillan - Executive Producer
- Ivan "Orthodox" Barias - Engineer, Instrumentation, Producer
- X Firm - Producer
