= Toshinobu Kubota =

Japanese singer (born 1962)

Toshinobu Kubota 久保田 利伸
- Also known as: Toshi Kubota, Funky Kubota
- Born: 24 July 1962 (age 64); Shizuoka Prefecture, Japan
- Origin: Kanbara, Shizuoka, Japan
- Genres: R&B, pop, go-go, soul, funk, blues, reggae, old skool, jazz, dance, neo soul, psychedelia
- Occupations: Singer-songwriter, musician, record producer, actor, radio personality
- Instruments: Vocals, piano, keyboard, guitar, drums, percussion
- Years active: 1981–present
- Labels: Sony Music Entertainment Japan, Mastersix Foundation
- Website: www.funkyjam.com/artist/kubota

Toshinobu "Toshi" Kubota (久保田 利伸, Kubota Toshinobu; born 24 July 1962) is a Japanese singer, songwriter, musician, music producer, and radio personality. He has produced six million-seller records and thirty-three Top 40 singles during his career. Kubota is currently part of Sony Music Japan. In addition, he has composed and written songs for many singers including Hiromi Iwasaki, Misia, Toshinori Yonekura, Kyōko Koizumi, and many other recording artists.

Kubota's musical genre has varied throughout his career including R&B, Go-go, soul, funk, blues, reggae, old skool, psychedelia, jazz, and pop. His artistic influences include Michael Jackson, Stevie Wonder, Marvin Gaye, Donny Hathaway, and Sly Stone. Kubota has pioneered in the sound "Japanese hip hop" and "Japanese soul", an amalgam of funk, pop, R&B and go that has influenced many other musicians.

Kubota has a tenor and falsetto vocal range and is known for his signature songs "Dance If You Want It", "Missing", "Love Rain (Koi no Ame)", "You Were Mine", "Give You My Love", and "La La La Love Song", which was the theme song of the television drama Long Vacation. Kubota has a total of seventeen studio albums and ten compilation albums. He is among the all-time best-selling Japanese music artists, having sold over 16 million records worldwide to date.

== Early life ==
Toshinobu Kubota was born in Shizuoka Prefecture, Japan. At a young age, he came in possession of Stevie Wonder's Songs in the Key of Life album. In high school, Kubota formed a high school band. After high school, he went to Tokyo to study economics. During that time, he began performing music at night clubs.

== Musical career ==
=== 1981–1982: Beginnings ===
Kubota got his start in 1981 when he met Haneda Ichiro at Komazawa University where they started the band Hottentots. A year later, he entered the Eastwest'82 contest and won the Best Vocalist award. By winning the contest, Kubota earned a record deal for his band to release their own music. He also started to appear as a guest vocalist for various albums for artists like Matsuoka Naoya. By the mid-1980s, Kubota began to compose for various artists like Iwasaki Hiromi, Koizumi Kyoko, and Tahara Toshihiko.

=== 1986–1989: Shake it Paradise and subsequent releases ===
In June 1986, he finally debuted as a singer with the single "Shitsui no Downtown". The single charted at number 53 on the Oricon Singles chart. In September 1986, Kubota released his first album, Shake It Paradise. The album reached number 22 on the Oricon charts. The album also spawned the singles "Ryuusei no Saddle" and "Missing". In December 1986, Kubota released a single, "Time", which charted at number 35 on the Oricon Weekly Singles chart.

In February 1987, Kubota released a single "Goddess", which charted at number 21 on the Oricon Singles chart. In April 1987, Kubota released his second album, Groovin', which spawned the singles "Randy Candy", "Psychic Beat", "Daiyamondo no Inutachi", "Kitakaze to Taiyō", and "Eien no Tsubasa". In October 1987, Kubota released a single "Cry on Your Smile", which reached number 8 on the Oricon Singles chart.

In February 1988, Kubota released the single "You Were Mine", which reached number 3 on the Oricon Singles chart. The single also sold over 100,000 units in Japan, reaching gold certification status. In September 1988, Kubota released his third album, Such A Funky Thang!. The album reached number 1 on the Oricon Albums charts and sold over a million copies. The album spawned the single "Dance If You Want It", which charted at number 2 on the Oricon Singles chart. In May 1988, he released his video Super Duper Vol. 1. In July 1988, he released his concert video Keep on Dancing. In January 1989, the second single "Indigo Waltz", which featured American-singer Lynn Davis, was released. The album's third single, "High Roller", charted at number 11 on the Oricon Singles chart.

In October 1989, Kubota released his first best-of album, The Baddest. The album charted at number 1 on the Oricon chart and sold a million copies. The album's lead single "Give You My Love", which also featured Lynn Davis, reached number 3 on the Oricon Singles chart.

=== 1990–1995: Various albums and career breakthrough ===
In July 1990, he released his fourth studio album, Bonga Wanga. In October 1990, he released the single "Be Wanabee", which reached number 16 on the Oricon Singles chart. In December 1990, Kubota released a single, "Our Song". In March 1991, Kubota released a duet single, "Forever Yours", with Alyson Williams. The song was Kubota's first English language single. In December 1990, he released his second video Super Duper Vol. 2.

In September 1991, Kubota released his fifth album, Kubojah: Parallel World I, which peaked at number 1 on the Oricon charts. The album spawned the singles "Keep on Jammin'" and "Honey B", which charted at number 15 on the Oricon Singles chart. The album's third single, "Amaoto", charted at number 33 on the Oricon Singles chart. In July 1991, he released his concert video, Bonga Wonga Tour 91.

In March 1992, Kubota released his fifth video album, Super Duper Vol. 3. In July 1992, he released his sixth album, Neptune. The album charted at number 3 on the Oricon Albums chart. The album featured the singles "Mayonaka No Taiyou" and "Let's Get A Groove: Yo! Hips". After the release of the singles, Kubota went on the "Funkin' On Neptune Tour".

In 1993, Kubota went to New York to work on his music. In May 1993, Kubota released the single "Yume with You", which charted at number 5 on the Oricon Singles chart. On the same day, he released another single, "Orquesta Futari", which charted at number 13 on the Oricon Singles chart. In September 1993, Kubota released his second best-of album, The Baddest II. The album peaked at number 1 on the Oricon charts.

In November 1994, Kubota released the lead single "Yoru ni Dakarete (A Night in Afro Blue)" from his upcoming seventh album. The song charted at number 5 on the Oricon Singles chart. In December 1994, he released the singles "Za-Ku-Za-Ku Digame" and "Sunshine, Moonlight". The single "Za-Ku-Za-Ku Digame charted at number 17 on the Oricon Singles chart. In January 1995, he released his seventh album, Bumpin' Voyage and his video album Super Duper Vol. 4. The album reached number 1 on the Oricon Albums chart. In July 1995, he released the single "Niji no Grand Slam", which charted at number 11 on the Oricon Singles chart.

=== 1995–1998: Transition to American music and subsequent releases ===
In September 1995, Kubota released his eighth album, Sunshine, Moonlight, which was his first English album. The album reached number 1 on the Oricon Albums chart and sold over a half of million copies worldwide. The album's lead single, "Funk It Up", was released along with the song "Nice & EZ" in the United States. The singles charted at number 91 on the Oricon Singles chart. The follow-up single, "Just the Two of Us", a duet with Caron Wheeler, was also released in the United States. The single reached number 30 on the Oricon Singles chart.

In May 1996, he released the single "La La La Love Song", a duet with model Naomi Campbell, which became his best selling single and sold over a million copies. The song was also featured as the main theme on the famous J-Drama "Long Vacation". The song also charted at number 1 on the Oricon Singles chart. In October 1996, he released the second single, "Body-Cation", from his upcoming album. The single charted at number 12 on the Oricon Singles chart. In December 1996, he released his concert DVD, Super Duper Vol. 5 from New York and his ninth album, La La La Love Thang. The album reached number 2 on the Oricon Albums chart. In late 1996, he went on the first international tour known as the "Oyeees! Tour".

In February 1997, Kubota released the single "Cymbals", which charted at number 19 on the Oricon Singles chart. In March 1997, he released the concert DVD Toshinobu Kubota Concert Tour 96: Oyeees!. In 1998, he released another single, "Ahhhhh!", which charted at number 5 on the Oricon Singles chart.

=== 1999–2000: Nothing But Your Love and As One ===
In July 1999, Kubota released the singles "Soul Bangin'" and "The Sound of Carnival". "Soul Bangin'" charted at number 25 on the Oricon Singles chart, while "The Sound of Carnival" reached number 15. In September 1999, he released another single, "Messengers' Rhyme: Rakushow, it's your Show!", which featured guest vocals from Naomi Shimizu. The single reached number 9 on the Oricon Singles chart.

On 21 June 2000, Kubota released the single "Nothing But Your Love" which charted at number 97. On 28 June 2000, he released his tenth album, Nothing But Your Love, which was his second English album. The album reached number 7 on the Oricon Albums chart. Later that year, Kubota released the second single, "Masquerade".

In September 2000, he released his eleventh album, As One and began the "Nothing But As One Tour". The album reached number 5 on the Oricon Albums chart. In November 2000, he released the single "Always Remain" from the album As One. The single reached number 66 on the Oricon Singles chart. The album's second single, "Polyrhythm", charted at number 22 on the Oricon Singles chart. In October 2000, he released his ninth video album, Super Duper Vol. 6.

=== 2001–2003: United Flow ===
In November 2001, Kubota released the lead single "Candy Rain" from his upcoming album. The single peaked at number 19 on the Oricon Singles chart. In February 2002, Kubota released the second single, "Respect (This & That)", which charted at number 49 on the Oricon Singles chart. In April 2002, he released the album United Flow, which charted at number 9 on the Oricon Albums chart. In July 2002, he released his third compilation album, The Baddest: Only for Lovers in the Mood. In December 2002, he released his fourth compilation album, The Baddest III, which charted at number 2 on the Oricon Albums chart.

In May 2003, he released his tenth video album, Super Duper Vol. 7 The Baddest III on Films. On 10 December 2003, Kubota released his Christmas maxi-single "Our Christmas". The single charted at number 10 on the Oricon Singles chart.

=== 2004–2007: Time to Share and For Real? ===
In September 2004, Kubota released his thirteenth album, Time to Share, which charted at number 25 on the Oricon Albums chart. This was Kubota's third English album. The album featured the singles "Breaking Through", "Living for Today", "Hold Me Down", and "Shadows of Your Love". In the same year, Kubota appeared on the American television show Soul Train. The Japanese dub of Shall We Dance? (2004 film) uses "a love story" by the singer as its theme song.

In April 2005, Kubota released the lead single "A Love Story" from his album "For Real?", which charted at number 43 on the Oricon Singles chart. In August 2005, he released the second single, "Club Happiness", which charted at number 40 on the Oricon Singles chart. In November 2005, he released the third single, "Beside You", which charted at number 25 on the Oricon Singles chart. In March 2006, he released his fourteenth album, For Real?, which charted at number 13 on the Oricon Albums chart.

In July 2006, he released a duet single with SunMin called "Keep Holding U", which was featured on the soundtrack of the movie Nihon Chinbotsu. The single charted at number 16 on the Oricon Weekly Single chart. In August 2007, Kubota released the concert DVD Live 2006 We For Real, which chart at number 43 on the Oricon DVD chart.

=== 2007–2010: Timeless Fly and Love & Rain: Love Songs ===
In 2007, Kubota began working on his fifteenth album. In August 2007, he released a single called "Magic", which featured rapper Kreva. In March 2008, Kubota released another single, "Flying Easy Loving Crazy", a duet song with Misia. "Flying Easy Loving Crazy" was the second in a series of collaborative singles released by Kubota. The song, featuring Japanese R&B singer Misia, with whom Kubota had worked in the past, was written and composed by Kubota. It served as image song for the Japanese promotional campaign of the Cirque du Soleil production Dralion, Daihatsu Dralion in Japan. The B-side of the single features the song "Babylon Lovers," which is performed by Kubota alone. "Flying Easy Loving Crazy" debuted on the Oricon Daily Singles chart at number 10 and peaked at number 18 on the Oricon Weekly Singles chart, with 6,071 copies sold in its first week. The single charted for six weeks and sold a total of 10,505 copies.

In January 2010, Kubota released the singles "Tomorrow Waltz" and "Star Light". The single "Tomorrow Waltz" charted at number 33 on the Oricon Weekly Singles chart. In February 2010, he released his fifteenth album, Timeless Fly. The album peaked at number nine on the Oricon Albums chart. Shortly after the release of the album, Kubota began the "Timeless Fly Tour" in Japan. Kubota also toured on the "Hall Tour 2010".

In June 2010, he released the single "Love Rain (Koi no Ame)", which charted at number three on the Oricon Singles chart and sold over 21,000 copies in its first week. In November 2010, he released his fifth compilation album, Love & Rain: Love Songs. The album peaked at number eleven on the Oricon Albums chart.

=== 2011–2012: Gold Skool ===
In July 2011, Kubota release the single "Nagareboshi to Koi no Ame". The single charted on number 24 on the Oricon Weekly Singles chart and sold over 2,727 copies in the first week of its release. In August 2011, he released his sixteenth album, Gold Skool. The album charted at number three, selling over 33,000 copies in its first week of release. In September 2011, Kubota released the second single "Koe ni Dekinai". The single charted number 20 on the Oricon Weekly Singles chart and sold over 3,287 copies in its first week of release. In October 2011, Kubota began the "Gold Skool Tour". On 7 October 2011, the concert tour began at Misato City Culture Hall in Saitama, Japan. The toured lasted for twenty dates. The tour concluded on 25 December 2011, when he performed at Fukuoka City Hall for the second time during the tour.

In January 2012, Kubota began his "Party Ain't A Party! Toshinobu Kubota 25th Anniversary! Tour", which celebrated his twenty-five years in the music industry. The toured only lasted for six dates. The toured concluded at National Yoyogi Stadium in Tokyo, Japan. In May 2012, Kubota released the concert DVD Party Ain't A Party!, which charted at number 5 on Oricon DVD charts.

=== 2013–present: Kubossa, L.O.K. and 30th Anniversary ===
In May 2013, Kubota released the dual single "Bring me up!/My Cherie Amour". On 15 May 2013, Kubota announced that his seventeenth album, Kubossa: Parallel World II, would be released in July 2013. Kubota's In the Universe Tour began in August 2013. In 2014, Kubota began recording his eighteenth album. In November 2014, Kubota began the "L.O.K Tour 2015" for his upcoming album.

In January 2015, Kubota announced that his eighteenth studio album "L.O.K." would be released on 18 March 2015. The album's title is an acronym for "Lots of Kisses". In March 2016, Kubota released a DVD called ''L.O.K Supa Dupa'', the DVD showed his national tour which had shown over 40+ shows.

In June 2016, Kubota announced his 30th anniversary, he said that he will be making special preparations for this year.

== Artistry ==
Kubota incorporates guitar, piano, percussion, into a majority of his song and often writes about love, heartbreak, and the celebration and humor of life. He has cited several musicians as his inspirations, including Stevie Wonder, Sly Stone, Michael Jackson, Marvin Gaye, and Donny Hathaway. Kubota's style is rooted in vintage soul music. He heavily incorporates classical piano and drums with R&B, soul, and pop music. He began experimenting with other genres, including reggae, go-go, psychedelic soul, funk, and rock music, in his latter albums, Kubojah: Parallel Word I, Bonga Wanga, Bumpin' Voyage, and Nothing But Your Love. Karen Hunter of New York Daily News stated "He speaks with an accent, but sings in pure funk. Toshi Kubota, the Japanese soul sensation, blends the old sounds of Sam Cooke, Stevie Wonder and even Luther Vandross with an up-to-date smoothed-out funk a la D'Angelo." Time magazine states "Kubota's favored '70s retro-glam ward-robe emphasizes the mood of the music he loves".

Kubota has vocal range of a tenor and falsetto, which spans three octaves. Often referred to as "Funky Kubota", Kubota has been commended as having a strong, raw and impassioned voice; others feel that his voice is a "sake-voiced rhythm" at time and that he pushes his voice out of its natural range.

Kubota is listed as one of Japan's best-selling artists, having sold over 16 million records worldwide.

== Personal life ==
In 1989, Kubota left Japan to move to New York, where, as of 2004, he resides. In October 2004, Kubota married a 31-year-old woman working for a Norwegian company. Their first son was born on 24 December 2004.

== Discography ==
=== Studio albums ===
- Shake It Paradise (1986)
- Groovin' (1987)
- Such A Funky Thang! (1988)
- Bonga Wanga (1990)
- Kubojah: Parallel World I (1991)
- Neptune (1992)
- Bumpin' Voyage (1995)
- Sunshine, Moonlight (1995)
- La La La Love Thang (1996)
- Nothing But Your Love (2000)
- As One (2000)
- United Flow (2002)
- Time to Share (2004)
- For Real? (2006)
- Timeless Fly (2010)
- Gold Skool (2011)
- Kubossa: Parallel World II (2013)
- L.O.K. (2015)
- 3周まわって素でLive!~THE HOUSE PARTY!~ (2017)
- Beautiful People (2019)

== Tours ==
- Shake It Paradise Tour (1986)
- Groovin' Tour (1987)
- Keep on Dancing Tour (1988)
- I Need Your Funky Thang! Tour (1989)
- Bonga Wanga Tour (1991)
- Funkin' On Neptune Tour (1992)
- Évry'ting Cook An Curie! Tour (1993)
- Oyeees! Tour (1996)
- Nothing But As One Tour (2001)
- Mo'Bounce to the Ounce: Soul Party Tour (2003)
- Toshi Kubota & Angie Stone Tour (with Angie Stone) (2005)
- We For Real? Tour (2006)
- Unity Tour (with Kreva) (2007)
- Timeless Fly Tour (2010)
- Hall Tour 2010 (2010)
- Gold Skool Tour (2011)
- 25th Anniversary Toshinobu Kubota Concert Tour 2012: Party Ain't A Party (2012)
- In the Universe Tour (2013)
- L.O.K. Supa Dupa Tour (2015)

== TV appearances ==
- Chance (1993, Fuji TV, Episode 12)
- No Tomorrow (2010, Episode: "Kyūyū") as the street musician
- Let's Play (2025, Episode: "Continue") as Himself (voice)

== Awards and nominations ==
Year	Nominee / work	Award	Result
1989	"Indigo Waltz"	MTV Video Music Awards Japan: International Viewer's Choice Award	Nominated
1996	"Funk It Up"	MTV Video Music Awards Japan: International Viewer's Choice Award	Nominated
2006	"Kimino No Soba Ni"	MTV Video Music Awards Japan: Best Video from a Film	Nominated
2008	"Magic" (Toshinobu Kubota meets Kreva)	MTV Video Music Awards Japan: Best Collaboration Video	Nominated
