= Sunmin =

South Korean singer (born 1987)

- Birth name: Sunmin Lee
- Born: August 4, 1987 (age 38)
- Origin: Daegu, South Korea
- Genres: Pop
- Occupation: Singer
- Years active: 2006–present
- Labels: LiveWorks Company (Korea) (2009–present); Victor Entertainment (Japan) (2006–present); Good Entertainment (Korea) (2006–2009)
- Website: sunmin.jp (in Japanese)

Sunmin (Korean: 선민, Katakana: ソンミン, born August 4, 1987) is a South Korean singer who speaks and sings in Korean, Japanese, and English. She debuted in 2006, with the single "Keep Holding You," a collaboration with the Japanese R&B singer Toshinobu Kubota. Her career was initially focused on the Japanese market, but her work became focused in South Korea from 2009 to 2010. She also contributed to original soundtracks of South Korean television series Master of Study and Gloria (2010 TV series). In 2010 to 2011, she was in the main South Korean musical production of Jekyll & Hyde as Lucy. In 2012 to 2013, she reprised her role as Lucy in the South Korean national tour. In spring 2013, Sunmin played Josephine in the South Korean production of Arsène Lupin, the musical.

== Biography ==
Sunmin was born on August 4, 1987, in Daegu, South Korea. She speaks Korean and Japanese, thus allowing her to perform in both languages. At a young age, she was inspired by R&B artist and especially American singer Christina Aguilera. She love to sing in front of neighbors and relatives since her childhood. At age 13, in her first year of middle school, she was enchanted by Aguilera's life and told many people that she dreamt of singing.

Determine to become a singer, Sunmin began receiving vocal training and soon made a demo tape of her singing. It would be the first step taken by Sunmin for her debut. After recording the demo, she left South Korea to pursue a career as an artist in Japan. She began studying the language and ensured the necessary need for her to prepare her debut, receiving more vocal training and working with the likes of Toshinobu Kubota who did a duet with her for her debut single, "Keep Holding U"(which was the OST for the 2006 Japanese film Sinking of Japan). She later released a South Korean version of the song with Shin Hye-sung of Shinhwa as Sunmin thanX Hyesung.

== Discography ==
=== Studio albums ===
Title	Album details	Peak chart positions
Title	Album details	JPN
Brand New Girl	Released: December 17, 2008 (JPN); Label: Victor Entertainment; Format: CD, digital download	248

=== Extended plays ===
Title	Album details	Peak chart positions
Title	Album details	JPN
Cover Girl	Released: August 27, 2008 (JPN); Label: Victor Entertainment; Format: CD, digital download	—

=== Singles ===
Title	Year	Peak chart positions		Album
Title	Year	JPN	KOR	Album
Japanese
"Keep Holding U" (with Toshinobu Kubota)	2006	16	—	Brand New Girl
"Koi no Kiseki" (恋の奇跡)	2006	33	—	Brand New Girl
"Love You. / The Rose"	2007	18	—	Brand New Girl
"Starting Story"	2007	55	—	Brand New Girl
"Another Wish"	2008	165	—	Brand New Girl
"Will"	2008	102	—	Brand New Girl
Korean
"Keeping Holding U" (with Shin Hye-sung)	2006	—	—	Non-album singles
"Superwoman"	2009	—	—	Non-album singles
"Lost" (놓치다)	2010	—	35	Non-album singles
"Rainbow Bridge"	2010	—	88	Non-album singles

=== Soundtrack appearances ===
- "Dreamer" (Master of Study, 2010)
- "Gloria" (Gloria, 2010)

== Television appearances ==
Fuji TV

- 『新堂本兄弟』(Shin Domoto Kyoudai) – since 2007/2/18, SunMin has done some background vocals for the show's band.
- 『新堂本兄弟』(Shin Domoto Kyoudai) – on the episode of 2007/7/15, she appeared in the first talk-section of the show.
