= Timeless Fly Tour =

2010 concert tour by Toshinobu Kubota

- Tour by Toshinobu Kubota
- Promotional poster for the tour
- Associated album: Timeless Fly
- Start date: June 8, 2010
- End date: November 7, 2010
- Legs: 1
- No. of shows: 17 in Japan

Toshinobu Kubota concert chronology
- We For Real? Tour (2006); Timeless Fly Tour (2010); Hall Tour 2010 (2010)

Timeless Fly Tour was the concert tour by Japanese singer-songwriter Toshinobu Kubota in support of his fifteenth album Timeless Fly.

== Background ==
The shows include songs from both Kubota's 2010 albums Timeless Fly / Love & Rain: Love Songs, as well as songs from his previous albums Shake It Paradise, Groovin', Such A Funky Thang!, and The Baddest. During the tour, Kubota also began a short tour known "Hall Tour 2010.

== Synopsis ==
The show opened in darkness with Kubota appearing on stage to perform "Keep It Rock" in multi-colored leopard skinned robe, as the stage lights lit up the stage. After the performance, Kubota removes his robe to reveal his blue colored blazer, blue crew neck T-shirt, and blue dress pants. He then proceeds into performing "Daiyamondo no Inutachi", followed by "Tomorrow Waltz". During "The Sound of Rain", Kubota and his background singers perform while sitting on stools along with the stage lights turned down low. The following song "Is It Over?" is a duet with background vocalist "Yuri". The stage lights were once again turned down for the slow-grooves "The Sound of Carnival" and "Nyte Flyte". In the song "La La La Love Song", the dancers joined Kubota on stage. Olivia Burrell also performs Naomi Campbell's parts in the song.

The background singers perform the songs "Right Here" and "Human Nature". Kubota returns the stage and performs Michael Jackson's song "Rock with You" in brown trenchcoat, black vest, white shirt, and red pants. During the song "The Other Half", Kubota removes his trenchcoat and the lights fade out as the song ends. Kubota performs "Missing" without any backing vocalists from his background singers.

In the song "Star Light", the dancers return to the stage as Kubota dances with them at certain times. The performance also featured a bass rift solo. The show proceeded as Kubota performed "You Were Mine" which contained brief excerpt of "Another Star". The final song on the tour's setlist was "Soul Mate". Afterwards, Kubota gives an encore with "Oh, What a Night" in which he introduces his band, background singers, and dancers. He also performs "Love Rain (Koi no Ame)" and "Cymbals" as the final songs of the show.

== Set list ==
- 1. "Keep It Rock"
- 2. "Daiyamondo no Inutachi"
- 3. "Tomorrow Waltz"
- 4. "Amaoto"
- 5. "Is It Over?" (duet with Yuri)
- 6. "The Sound Of Carnival"
- 7. "Nyte Flyte"
- 8. "La La La Love Song" (featuring Olivia Burrell)
- 9. "Right Here / Human Nature" (Only sung by the background singers )
- 10. "Rock with You"
- 11. "The Other Half"
- 12. "Missing"
- 13. "Indigo Waltz"
- 14. "Star Light"
- 15. "You Were Mine" (contains excerpts from "Another Star")
- 16. "Soul Mate"

Encore

- 17. "Oh, What a Night"
- 18. "Love Rain (Koi no Ame)"
- 19. "Cymbals"

== Personnel ==
Band

- Bass: Carlos Henderson
- Deejay: DJ Mass
- Drums: Ralph Rolle
- Guitar: Ohnishi Yusuke
- Keyboards: Philip Woo, Kakizaki Yoichiro

Background Vocalists

- Yuri
- Yoshida Hiroshi
- Olivia Burrell

Dancers

- Masako
- Nao

== Tour dates ==
Date	City	Country	Venue
June 8, 2010	Fukuoka	Japan	Fukuoka City Hall
June 20, 2010	Zama	Japan	Harmony Hall Zama
June 25, 2010	Tokyo	Japan	NHK Hall
June 26, 2010	Tokyo	Japan	NHK Hall
July 13, 2010	Shizuoka	Japan	Shizuoka Shimin Bunka Kaikan Hall
July 17, 2010	Tokyo	Japan	Tokyo Electron Hall Miyagi
July 24, 2010	Matsuyama	Japan	Camellia Hall Matsuyama City Comprehensive Community Center
July 28, 2010	Tokyo	Japan	Tokyo International Forum Hall A
July 29, 2010	Tokyo	Japan	Tokyo International Forum Hall A
August 7, 2010	Kobe	Japan	International Hall, Kobe International House
August 14, 2010	Hiroshima	Japan	Hiroshima ALSOK Hall
August 15, 2010	Okayama	Japan	Okayama Shimin Kaikan
August 17, 2010	Osaka	Japan	Osaka International Convention Center Main Hall (Additional performances)
August 22, 2010	Niigata	Japan	Niigata Prefectural Civic
September 8, 2010	Kagoshima	Japan	Kagoshima Shimin Bunka Hall
October 7, 2010	Nagoya	Japan	Nagoya Congress Center Century Hall
November 7, 2010	Nagoya	Japan	Nagoya Congress Center Century Hall
