= The Best DJ Remixes =

Decimo X Aniversario de Misia: The Tour of Misia 2008 Eighth World + The Best DJ Remixes

Remix album and video by Misia
- Released: June 25, 2008
- Recorded: 1998–2008
- Genre: R&B, pop, dance, house
- Length: 73:07 (Standard edition); 77:47 (Limited edition)
- Label: BMG Japan

Misia chronology
Eighth World (2008)	Decimo X Aniversario de Misia: The Tour of Misia 2008 Eighth World + The Best DJ Remixes (2008)	Just Ballade (2009)

Decimo X Aniversario de Misia: The Tour of Misia 2008 Eighth World + The Best DJ Remixes is the fifth remix album by Japanese R&B singer Misia, released June 25, 2008. The release is a two-disc combination of The Tour of Misia 2008 Eighth World DVD and a remixes compilation, The Best DJ Remixes. The Tour of Misia 2008 Eighth World was also simultaneously released as a stand-alone Blu-ray.

Decimo X Aniversario de Misia debuted at #10 on the daily Oricon albums chart and at #15 on the weekly chart, selling 14,026 copies in its first week. It is the 450th best selling album of 2008.

== Track listing ==
The Best DJ Remixes (CD)
No.	Title	Remixer(s)	Length
1.	"Everything (Junior + Gomi Remix) (Radio Mix)"	Junior Vasquez, Gomi	5:09
2.	"Sweetness (Satoshi Tomiie Remix) (Radio Mix)"	Satoshi Tomiie	4:22
3.	"Wasurenai Hibi (Hex Hector Remix) (Radio Mix)"	Hex Hector	5:33
4.	"Yakusoku no Tsubasa (Gomi's Vajra Mix) (Radio Mix)"	Gomi	6:09
5.	"Royal Chocolate Flush (Ichiro 51 Remix)"	Mega Raiders	4:30
6.	"Tsutsumikomu Yō ni... (DJ Watarai Remix featuring Muro)"	DJ Watarai	6:00
7.	"Nemurenu Yoru wa Kimi no Sei (Joe Claussell Remix) (Album Edit)"	Joaquin "Joe" Claussell	4:33
8.	"Taiyō ga Iru Kara (Frankie Knuckles Remix) (Radio Classic)" (太陽がいるから Because There's the Sun)	Frankie Knuckles	5:31
9.	"Melody (Masters At Work Remix) (Radio Mix)"	Masters At Work	4:44
10.	"Sweet Pain (Francois K. Remix) (Album Edit)"	Francois Kevorkian	4:46
11.	"Ano Natsu no Mama de (Erick Morillo Remix) (Radio Mix)" (あの夏のままで Just Like That Summer)	Erick Morillo, Todd Gardner	4:33
12.	"To Be in Love (Studio Apartment Remix) (Short Version)"	Studio Apartment	6:45
13.	"The Glory Day (Malawi Rocks Remix) (Radio Mix)"	Malawi Rocks	6:15
14.	"Never Gonna Cry! (Junior Vasquez Remix) (Radio Mix)"	Junior Vasquez	4:43
15.	"Yes Forever (Muro's "Promo" Mix)" (Limited edition bonus track)	Muro	4:14

The Tour of Misia 2008 Eighth World (DVD)
No.	Title	Length
1.	"Ishin Denshin" (以心伝心 Telepathy)
2.	"Royal Chocolate Flush"
3.	"Dance dance"
4.	"Missing Autumn"
5.	"Sweetness"
6.	"Mekubase no Burūsu" (めくばせのブルース Winking Blues)
7.	"Hybrid Breaks"
8.	"Kimi wa Sōgen ni Nekoronde" (君は草原に寝ころんで You Lay Down On the Grasslands)
9.	"Any Love"
10.	"Soba ni Ite..." (そばにいて… Stay by My Side)
11.	"To Be in Love"
12.	"Everything (Junior Vasquez Remix)"
13.	"Color of Life"
14.	"Into the Light"
15.	"TYO"
16.	"Fly Away"
17.	"Taiyō no Chizu" (太陽の地図 Map of the Sun)
18.	"Taiyō no Malaika" (太陽のマライカ Angel of the Sun)
19.	"Tsutsumikomu Yō ni..."
20.	"Royal Chocolate Flush (Music Video)" (Standard edition bonus track)

== Charts and sales ==
Chart (2008)	Peak position	Sales
Japan Oricon Daily Albums Chart	10	20,482
Japan Oricon Weekly Albums Chart	15	20,482
Japan Oricon Yearly Albums Chart	450	20,482
Taiwan Five Music J-pop/K-pop Chart	4	
Taiwan G-Music J-pop Chart	10	

== Release history ==
Region	Date	Label	Format
Japan	June 25, 2008	BMG Japan	CD+DVD
Hong Kong	July 25, 2008	Sony Music	CD+DVD
Taiwan	August 1, 2008	Sony Music	CD+DVD
South Korea	September 9, 2008	Sony Music	CD+DVD
