= Nagareboshi to Koi no Ame =

Single by Toshinobu Kubota

from the album Gold Skool
- Released: July 13, 2011
- Recorded: 2011
- Genre: R&B
- Length: 4:17
- Label: SME Records
- Songwriter(s): Toshinobu Kubota

Toshinobu Kubota singles chronology
"Love Rain (Koi no Ame)" (2010)	"Nagareboshi to Koi no Ame" (2011)	"Koe ni Dekinai" (2011)

Music video
- "Nagareboshi to Koi no Ame" on YouTube

"Nagareboshi to Koi no Ame" is a song recorded by Japanese R&B singer Toshinobu Kubota for his sixteenth studio album, Gold Skool (2011).

== Background ==
Kubota in the music video (Nagareboshi to Koi no Ame).

On July 13, 2011, "Nagareboshi to Koi no Ame" was released as the lead single as his sixteenth album Gold Skool. The song charted at number 15 on the Oricon Daily Singles and number 24 on the Oricon Weekly Singles chart, selling 2,727 copies in the first week of its release. "Nagareboshi to Koi no Ame" also chart at number 7 on Billboard Japan Hot 100 chart. It is noted that Kubota name checks several of his previous songs including "Candy Rain", "Goddess", "Sunshine Moonlight", "Niji no Grand Slam", "Never Turn Back", "Keep on Jammin'", "As One", and many other songs. The song also became the theme song for the NTV show "Refreshing". He also name check his previous albums including "Shake It Paradise", "Such A Funky Thang!", and "Sunshine, Moonlight".

=== Music video ===
Kubota also shot a music video for "Nagareboshi to Koi no Ame". The music video features Kubota in a room singing the song. The music video also uses music video clips from Kubota's previous music videos including "Ryuusei no Sadoru", "La La La Love Song", "Ahhhhh!", "Dance If You Want It", "Funk It Up", and "Love Rain (Koi no Ame)".

== Track listing ==
- CD Single
1. Nagareboshi to Koi no Ame
2. Polyrhythm (Name Remix)
3. Nagareboshi to Koi no Ame (Karaoke)
- Limited edition DVD
1. Nagareboshi to Koi no Ame (Music video)

== Charts and certifications ==
Release	Chart	Peak position	Sales total
July 13, 2011	Japan Oricon Daily Singles Chart	15	2,727
July 13, 2011	Japan Oricon Weekly Singles Chart	24	2,727
July 13, 2011	Japan Billboard Hot 100	7	2,727
