= The Tour of Misia 2008 Eighth World =

2007–08 concert tour by Misia

- Tour by Misia
- Official poster for the tour
- Associated album: Eighth World
- Start date: December 21, 2007
- End date: February 23, 2008
- Legs: 1
- No. of shows: 12

Misia concert chronology
- Hoshizora no Live IV Classics (2007); The Tour of Misia 2008 Eighth World (2007–08); The Tour of Misia Discotheque Asia (2008–09)

The Tour of Misia 2008 Eighth World was the thirteenth concert tour by Japanese recording artist Misia, in support of her album Eighth World (2008). Comprising a set list of songs from Eighth World and previous albums, the tour visited arenas nationwide and spanned three months. The Tour of Misia 2008 Eighth World was simultaneously announced with Misia's Hoshizora no Live IV Classics summer tour in April 2007. The tour commenced in late December 2006 and concluded in late February 2007. Initially scheduled to run for eleven shows, an additional date at the Yokohama Arena venue was added as the final show. Sponsored by OCN, the tour drew an estimated audience of 150,000.

On January 10, 2008, it was announced that Misia was suffering from acute tonsillitis. Despite cancelling the promotional campaign for Eighth World, she recovered on time for the January 19 show.

A wrap party titled The Tour of Misia 2008 Eighth World Cocktail Party was held two days after the conclusion of the tour at the ageHa nightclub. WOWOW aired a TV edit of The Tour of Misia 2008 Eighth World on April 15, 2008.

== Setlist ==
December 21, 2007
1. "Ishin Denshin" (以心伝心)
2. "Royal Chocolate Flush"
3. "Dance Dance"
4. "Missing Autumn"
5. "Any Love"
6. "Sweetness"
7. "La La La"
8. "Mekubase no Blues" (めくばせのブルース)
9. "Kimi wa Sōgen ni Nekoronde" (君は草原に寝ころんで)
10. "Hoshi no Furu Oka" (星の降る丘)
11. "Soba ni Ite..." (そばにいて...) (Taiwan Version)
12. "To Be In Love"
13. "TYO" (Taiwan Version)
14. "Fly Away"
15. "Taiyō no Chizu" (太陽の地図)

Encore

16. "Everything" (Junior + Gomi Club Extended Mix)
17. "Color of Life"
18. "Into the Light"
19. "Taiyō no Malaika" (太陽のマライカ)
December 22, 2007
1. "Ishin Denshin" (以心伝心)
2. "Royal Chocolate Flush"
3. "Dance Dance"
4. "Missing Autumn"
5. "Sweetness"
6. "La La La"
7. "Mekubase no Blues" (めくばせのブルース)
8. "Kimi wa Sōgen ni Nekoronde" (君は草原に寝ころんで)
9. "Any Love"
10. "Soba ni Ite..." (そばにいて...) (Taiwan Version)
11. "Hoshi no Furu Oka" (星の降る丘)
12. "To Be In Love"
13. "Everything" (Junior + Gomi Club Extended Mix)
14. "Color of Life"
15. "Into the Light"

Encore

16. "TYO" (Taiwan Version)
17. "Fly Away"
18. "Taiyō no Chizu" (太陽の地図)
19. "Taiyō no Malaika" (太陽のマライカ)
December 31, 2007
1. "Ishin Denshin" (以心伝心)
2. "Royal Chocolate Flush"
3. "Dance Dance"
4. "Missing Autumn"
5. "Sweetness"
6. "La La La"
7. "Mekubase no Blues" (めくばせのブルース)
8. "Kimi wa Sōgen ni Nekoronde" (君は草原に寝ころんで)
9. "Any Love"
10. "Soba ni Ite..." (そばにいて...) (Taiwan Version)
11. "Hoshi no Furu Oka" (星の降る丘)
12. "To Be In Love"
13. "Everything" (Junior + Gomi Club Extended Mix)
14. "Color of Life"
15. "Into the Light"

Encore

16. "TYO" (Taiwan Version)
17. "Fly Away"
18. "Taiyō no Chizu" (太陽の地図)
19. "Taiyō no Malaika" (太陽のマライカ)
20. "Tsutsumikomu Yō ni..."
January 5, 2008
1. "Ishin Denshin" (以心伝心)
2. "Royal Chocolate Flush"
3. "Dance Dance"
4. "Missing Autumn"
5. "Sweetness"
6. "La La La"
7. "Mekubase no Blues" (めくばせのブルース)
8. "Kimi wa Sōgen ni Nekoronde" (君は草原に寝ころんで)
9. "Any Love"
10. "Soba ni Ite..." (そばにいて...) (Taiwan Version)
11. "Hoshi no Furu Oka" (星の降る丘)
12. "Everything" (Junior + Gomi Club Extended Mix)
13. "Color of Life"
14. "Into the Light"

Encore

15. "TYO" (Taiwan Version)
16. "Fly Away"
17. "Taiyō no Chizu" (太陽の地図)
18. "Taiyō no Malaika" (太陽のマライカ)
January 6, 2008
1. "Ishin Denshin" (以心伝心)
2. "Royal Chocolate Flush"
3. "Dance Dance"
4. "Missing Autumn"
5. "Sweetness"
6. "La La La"
7. "Mekubase no Blues" (めくばせのブルース)
8. "Kimi wa Sōgen ni Nekoronde" (君は草原に寝ころんで)
9. "Any Love"
10. "Soba ni Ite..." (そばにいて...) (Taiwan Version)
11. "Hoshi no Furu Oka" (星の降る丘)
12. "Everything" (Junior + Gomi Club Extended Mix)
13. "Color of Life"
14. "Into the Light"

Encore

15. "TYO" (Taiwan Version)
16. "Fly Away"
17. "Taiyō no Chizu" (太陽の地図)
18. "Taiyō no Malaika" (太陽のマライカ)
19. "Tsutsumikomu Yō ni..."
January 19–20, 2008
1. "Ishin Denshin" (以心伝心)
2. "Royal Chocolate Flush"
3. "Dance Dance"
4. "Missing Autumn"
5. "Sweetness"
6. "La La La"
7. "Mekubase no Blues" (めくばせのブルース)
8. "Kimi wa Sōgen ni Nekoronde" (君は草原に寝ころんで)
9. "Any Love"
10. "Soba ni Ite..." (そばにいて...) (Taiwan Version)
11. "Hoshi no Furu Oka" (星の降る丘)
12. "To Be In Love"
13. "Everything" (Junior + Gomi Club Extended Mix)
14. "Color of Life"
15. "Into the Light"

Encore

16. "TYO" (Taiwan Version)
17. "Fly Away"
18. "Taiyō no Chizu" (太陽の地図)
19. "Taiyō no Malaika" (太陽のマライカ)
January 26–27, February 16, 2008
1. "Ishin Denshin" (以心伝心)
2. "Royal Chocolate Flush"
3. "Dance Dance"
4. "Missing Autumn"
5. "Sweetness"
6. "Mekubase no Blues" (めくばせのブルース)
7. "Kimi wa Sōgen ni Nekoronde" (君は草原に寝ころんで)
8. "Any Love"
9. "Soba ni Ite..." (そばにいて...) (Taiwan Version)
10. "Tobikata o Wasureta Chiisana Tori" (飛び方を忘れた小さな鳥) (Star Ocean Version)
11. "To Be In Love"
12. "Everything" (Junior + Gomi Club Extended Mix)
13. "Color of Life"
14. "Into the Light"

Encore

15. "TYO" (Taiwan Version)
16. "Fly Away"
17. "Taiyō no Chizu" (太陽の地図)
18. "Taiyō no Malaika" (太陽のマライカ)
February 17–23, 2008
1. "Ishin Denshin" (以心伝心)
2. "Royal Chocolate Flush"
3. "Dance Dance"
4. "Missing Autumn"
5. "Sweetness"
6. "Mekubase no Blues" (めくばせのブルース)
7. "Kimi wa Sōgen ni Nekoronde" (君は草原に寝ころんで)
8. "Any Love"
9. "Soba ni Ite..." (そばにいて...) (Taiwan Version)
10. "Tobikata o Wasureta Chiisana Tori" (飛び方を忘れた小さな鳥) (Star Ocean Version)
11. "To Be In Love"
12. "Everything" (Junior + Gomi Club Extended Mix)
13. "Color of Life"
14. "Into the Light"

Encore

15. "TYO" (Taiwan Version)
16. "Fly Away"
17. "Taiyō no Chizu" (太陽の地図)
18. "Taiyō no Malaika" (太陽のマライカ)
19. "Tsutsumikomu Yō ni..."

== Tour dates ==
Date	City	Country	Venue
December 21, 2007	Osaka	Japan	Osaka-jō Hall
December 22, 2007	Osaka	Japan	Osaka-jō Hall
December 31, 2007	Fukuoka	Japan	Marine Messe Fukuoka
January 5, 2008	Tokyo	Japan	Yoyogi National Gymnasium
January 6, 2008	Tokyo	Japan	Yoyogi National Gymnasium
January 19, 2008	Saitama	Japan	Saitama Super Arena
January 20, 2008	Saitama	Japan	Saitama Super Arena
January 26, 2008	Osaka	Japan	Osaka-jō Hall
January 27, 2008	Osaka	Japan	Osaka-jō Hall
February 16, 2008	Nagoya	Japan	Nippon Gaishi Hall
February 17, 2008	Nagoya	Japan	Nippon Gaishi Hall
February 23, 2008	Yokohama	Japan	Yokohama Arena

== Personnel ==
- Keyboards – Tohru Shigemi
- Drums – Jun Aoyama
- Guitar – Kenji Suzuki
- Bass – Takeshi Taneda
- DJ – Ta–Shi
- Manipulator – Go Sudo
- Dancer(s) – Stezo, U-Ge, Michie, Hyrossi, Takuya, Hiro, Yoshie, Tatsuo, Medusa, Akko
- Executive Producer – Hiroto Tanigawa
- Production Producer – Kazuhiko Igarashi
- Sound Planner – Keiji Shigeta
- Lighting Planner – Ikuo Ogawa
- Lighting Operator(s) – Masaaki Takahashi, Yasuhiro Komukai, Maki Morita, Shihou Takahashi, Makoto Setoyama, Noriko Morimoto, Mizoo Mitsunaga
- Lighting Effect Planner – Seiichi Tozuka
- Lighting Effect Operator(s) – Hiroyuki Koike, Tetsuya Oki, Mami Sato
- Special Effect Planner – Takeshi Hagino
- Special Effect Operator – Kanako Chiba
- Set Design – Yukako Arai
- Set Direction – Chihiro Natori, Hiromi Shibata, Teruhiko Kuroki
- Stage Manager(s) – Shuichi Majima, Ryoko Tsukahara, Mitsuru Morita, Arata Shimizu
- Art Director – Mitsuo Shindo
- Inferno Artist – Shinichi Ishikawa
- PA Operator(s) – Takashi Mitsui, Miyuki Tsuzuki, Tomonori Yasui, Kazuharu Takise, Joji Fukumoto, Yuta Koga
- Equipment Technician(s) – Kazuyuki Okada, Keiji Tateishi, Kazuya Takahashi, Satsuki Hosomi, Hiroshi Yamane
- Power Supply Operator – Naotaka Tanimura
- Balloon – Minoru Osada
- Visual System – Yasuhiro Shimizu, Ryuta Honma
- Visual System Producer – Atsuki Yukawa
- Visual System Production Manager(s) – Soyogi Sugiura, Shinichi "Sam" Kawase
- Visual System Designer – Rie Kategawa
- Computational Graphic – Yutaro Amano
- "Ishin Denshin" Character Designer – Keiji Yanobe
- Flying System – Yoshihiko Tanaka, Hiromasa Echigo, Satoru Inagaki, Yusuke Nakamura, Takeshi Iwamoto, Toshisue Kubo
- Wardrobe – Erina Ishihara, Yumiko Otsuka, Azusa Shibata
- Transporter(s) – Setsuo Noto, Miwa Morioka
- Band Manager – Mari Koda
- Dancer Manager – Hiroaki Kusano
- Band & Dancer Costume Director – Mitsuru Kurosawa
- Dancer Trainer(s) – Yukinori Narushima, Takayuki Yumioka, Kayoko Nakagawa
- Merchandiser(s) – Keisuke Sato, Hiroshi Suzuki
- Costume Director – Sakae Kaneda
- Make Up – Kaori Kasso
- Hair – Yukimi Ueda
- Artist Manager(s) – Toshiyuki Kimura, Rui Nishikawa
- Artist Food Coordinator – Masashi Mizukoshi
- Club Msa – Saori Sonoda, Kyosuke Ogata, Tsutomu Yamashiro, Hiroko Goto
- Tour Coordination Assistant(s) – Kumiko Ohata, Kimie Ikeda
- Promoter(s) – Kyodo Osaka, Kyodo Nishinippon, Sundayfolk Promotion, Disk Garage
- Production Manager(s) – Chihiro Iwasaki, Hiroyuki Hagiwara

Credits and personnel as per The Tour of Misia 2008 Eighth World concert DVD.
