= Just Ballade =

Studio album by Misia
- Released: December 16, 2009
- Genre: R&B; pop; soul
- Length: 1:01:55
- Label: Ariola Japan
- Producer: Misia; Hiroto Tanigawa (exec.)

Misia chronology
The Best DJ Remixes (2008)	Just Ballade (2009)	Soul Quest (2011)

Singles from Just Ballade
- 1. "Yes Forever" Released: April 30, 2008; 2. "Yakusoku no Tsubasa" Released: May 28, 2008; 3. "Sukoshi Zutsu Taisetsu ni" Released: February 4, 2009; 4. "Ginga" Released: June 10, 2009; 5. "Itsumademo" Released: June 10, 2009; 6. "Aitakute Ima" Released: November 18, 2009; 7. "Hoshi no Yō ni..." Released: December 16, 2009

Just Ballade (stylized as JUST BALLADE) is the ninth studio album by Japanese singer Misia. It was released on December 16, 2009 by Ariola Japan, marking Misia's first album release under the label. The album yielded seven singles, "Yes Forever" and "Yakusoku no Tsubasa", released in 2008, the digital exclusive "Sukoshi Zutsu Taisetsu ni", the double A-side single "Ginga" / "Itsumademo", "Aitakute Ima", and lastly "Hoshi no Yō ni...", released on the same day as the album. Just Ballade was certified Gold by the Recording Industry Association of Japan.

== Background and release ==
Fresh off The Tour of Misia Discotheque Asia, where the musical emphasis was on lively, uptempo dance music, Misia wanted a change of pace with the next album. She was inspired by the positive feedback she received from concert audiences in relation to the ballad section of her Discotheque Asia setlist, and set out to make an album that could recreate the same "well-filled quiet" that garnered such a favorable reception. As the title of the album suggests, Just Ballade consists predominantly of ballads, however not all tracks on the record are slow-tempo songs. In an interview with Excite, Misia explained the varied tempo and sound of the album by stating that, while people might have a general preconception of what a ballad will sound like, it's not as clear cut. She remarks that, to her, what makes a song a ballad isn't the piano or the orchestra, but whether the song can move her to tears.

Just Ballade is Misia's first studio album in close two years, since Eighth World. It was issued in Blu-spec CD format and released in three different versions, a standard CD-only edition, and two limited editions. Limited edition "A" comes packaged in a CD sleeve with a different cover art and includes a DVD featuring six music videos, while limited edition "B" is packaged in a pop-up case, also with an alternate cover art, housed in a clear sleeve and comes with a 28-page color booklet.

In addition to the singles, several album tracks were also used in promotional campaigns leading up to their release. "Chiheisen no Mukōgawa e" served as ending theme to the TX news program World Business Satellite, "Boku no Kimochi" as ending theme to the AX variety show Himitsu no Kenmin Show, and "Work It Out" as ending theme to the AX news program Jōhō Live Miyaneya.

== Critical reception ==
Professional ratings
Review scores
Source	Rating
AllMusic	3/5 stars

CDJournal critics remarked that the listener should not take the title of the album too literally, as the album includes many styles of ballads. They noted that the sound on the record is "perfected to the last detail". Misia was praised for her powerful vocal performance, with critics describing it as "transportive". Adam Greenberg of AllMusic, pronounced Misia's voice to be the "star of the show", but also noted that she can sometimes go overboard and overpower the sensibility of the ballad. Writing for Bounce, Aokinoko described Just Ballade as a "love song collection" basking in the "essence of many different styles." Aokinoko praised the record as "stimulating", singled out "Aitakute Ima", "Ginga" and "Call Me Love Me" as the standout tracks, and called it the "perfect lovers' soundtrack".

== Commercial performance ==
Just Ballade entered the daily Oricon Albums Chart at number 3, selling 18,000 copies on its first day. It slid to number 4 the following day, where it stayed for the rest of the week. The album debuted at number 4 on the weekly Oricon Albums Chart, selling 57,000 copies. It also debuted at number 4 on the Billboard Japan Top Albums Sales chart. The album fell to number 8 on its second week on the Oricon chart, logging sales of 33,000 copies. Just Ballade charted for twenty-one non-consecutive weeks on the Oricon Albums Chart, selling a reported total of 143,000 copies during its run.

== Track listing ==
No.	Title	Writer(s)	Arranger(s)	Length
1.	"Sukoshi Zutsu Taisetsu ni"	Misia; Sinkiroh	Tohru Shigemi	5:08
2.	"Aitakute Ima"	Misia; Jun Sasaki	Sasaki	5:58
3.	"Work It Out"	Misia; Hinata; JP	JP	2:48
4.	"Chiheisen no Mukōgawa e" (地平線の向こう側へ, "Beyond the Horizon")	Misia; Sinkiroh	Sinkiroh	4:53
5.	"Call Me Love Me"	Misia; Sinkiroh	Gomi	4:08
6.	"So Beautiful"	Misia; Toshiaki Matsumoto	Shigemi	4:58
7.	"Kuchibiru to Kuchibiru" (唇と唇, "Lip on Lip")	Hinata; Sinkiroh	Shigemi	4:53
8.	"Baobab no Ki no Shita de" (バオバヴの木の下で, Baobavu no Ki no Shita de, "Under the Baobab Tree")	Misia	Shigemi	3:36
9.	"Yakusoku no Tsubasa"	Misia; Sasaki	Sasaki	5:19
10.	"Boku no Kimochi" (僕のきもち, "How I Feel")	Misia; Hinata; Sinkiroh	Gomi	4:16
11.	"Yes Forever" (Piano Version)	Misia; Sinkiroh	Shigemi	4:55
12.	"Hoshi no Yō ni..."	Misia; Sinkiroh	Shigemi	4:58
13.	"Ginga"	Misia; Shusui; Fredrik Hult; Carl Utbult; Tebey	Utbult; Hult	4:36
14.	"Itsumademo"	Misia; Sinkiroh	Sinkiroh	1:29
Total length:				1:01:55

Limited edition "A" DVD
No.	Title	Director(s)	Length
1.	"Baobab no Ki no Shita de" (Music Clip)	Mitsuo Shindō
2.	"Hoshi no Yō ni..." (Music Clip)	Ukon Kamimura
3.	"Aitakute Ima" (Music Clip)	Noriyuki Tanaka
4.	"Ginga" (Music Clip)	Kamimura
5.	"Yes Forever" (Music Clip)	Kamimura
6.	"Yakusoku no Tsubasa" (Music Clip)	Tomoo Noda

== Credits and personnel ==
Personnel

- Lead vocals, production – Misia
- Backing vocals – Misia, Bennie Diggs, George Hodnett, JP, Fonzi Thornton, Vaneese Thomas, Crystal McGee, Marcia Sapp Salter
- Songwriting – Misia, Sinkiroh, Jun Sasaki, Hinata, JP, Toshiaki Matsumoto, Shusui, Carl Utbult, Fredrik Hult, Tebey
- Backing vocal arrangement – JP, Sinkiroh, Jun Sasaki, Misia, Gomi, Bennie Diggs
- Arrangement – Tohru Shigemi, Jun Sasaki, JP, Sinkiroh, Gomi, Carl Utbult, Fredrik Hult
- Orchestral arrangement – Gen Ittetsu, Dan Miyakawa
- Strings arrangement – Tohru Shigemi, Gen Ittetsu
- Piano – Tohru Shigemi
- Guitar – Hirokazu Ogura, Robin Macatangay, Masato Ishinari, Kazumi Watanabe, Fredrik Hult, Shuhei Yamaguchi
- Sitar – Masato Ishinari
- Bass – Takeshi Taneda, Richie Goods
- Acoustic bass – Richie Goods
- Acoustic guitar – Shuhei Yamaguchi
- Electric guitar – Takashi Yamaguchi
- Electric keyboard – Gomi, Henry Hey, Tohru Shigemi, Carl Utbult
- Keyboard programming – Carl Utbult
- Drums – Robert Di Pietro, Harvey Mason
- Drum programming – Gomi
- Percussion – Samuel Torres
- Kalimba – Hiromi Kondo
- Djembe – Masaya Oonishi
- Strings – Gen Ittetsu Strings, Crusher Kimura Strings
- Cello – Masami Horisawa
- Harp – Tomoyuki Asakawa
- English horn – Hiroshi Shibayama
- French horn – Hiroyuki Minami, Hiroyuki Nakajima, Otohiko Fujita, Yasushi Katsumata, Kenshow Hagiwara
- Flugelhorn – Tony Kadleck
- Flute – Hideyo Takakuwa, Tasuo Yamamoto
- Fagotto – Toshiki Takei
- Harmonica – Russell Graham
- All other instruments – Jun Sasaki, Sinkiroh, Tohru Shigemi, Masayuki Kumahara, Gomi
- Engineering – Yoshikazu Nakabayashi, Dave Darlington, Ken Nishi, Masahiro Kawaguchi, Sui, Masashi Hashimoto, Akira Kusayanagi, Sebastien Plassais, Andrew Hey
- Mixing – Yoshikazu Nakabayashi, Dave Darlington, Masashi Hashimoto, Shojiro Watanabe, Masashi Matsubayashi, David Thoener
- Mastering – Herb Powers Jr.

== Charts ==
=== Daily and weekly charts ===
Chart (2009)	Peak position
Japan Weekly Albums (Oricon)	4
Japan Top Albums Sales (Billboard)	4

=== Monthly and year-end charts ===
Chart (2009–10)	Peak position
Japan Monthly Albums (Oricon)	8
Japan Yearly Albums (Oricon)	58
Japan Top Albums Sales Year End (Billboard)	47
Japan Yearly Albums (Mora)	32

== Certification and sales ==
Region	Certification	Certified units/sales
Japan (RIAJ)	Gold	143,000

== Release history ==
Region	Date	Format(s)	Label	Ref.
Japan	December 16, 2009	Blu-spec CD/DVD; CD; digital download	Ariola Japan	
South Korea	December 18, 2009	CD	Sony Music Korea	
Taiwan	December 18, 2009	CD/DVD	Sony Music Taiwan	
Hong Kong	December 29, 2009	CD/DVD	Sony Music Hong Kong	
Various	July 15, 2016	Digital download	Ariola Japan	
