= Love Rain (disambiguation) =

Love Rain is a South Korean television series also known as Sarang bi.

Love Rain may also refer to:

- "Love Rain" (Jill Scott song), 2000
- "Love Rain" (Toshinobu Kubota song) "Koi no Ame", a 2010 Japanese song
