= The Best of Kubota Toshinobu =

Compilation album by Toshinobu Kubota
- Released: 1999
- Genre: R&B, pop
- Length: 79:21
- Label: Sony Music Entertainment Taiwan

Toshinobu Kubota chronology
Toshinobu Kubota Greatest Hits (1998)	The Best of Kubota Toshinobu (1999)	Nothing But Your Love (2000)

The Best of Kubota Toshinobu is the fourth album in a series of greatest hits compilations by Japanese singer Toshinobu Kubota. The album was only released in 1999 in Taiwan on the Sony Music Entertainment Taiwan recording label. The album sold nearly ten thousand copies in Taiwan.

== Track listing ==
1. "La La La Love Song" (featuring Naomi Campbell)
2. "Messenger's Rhyme-Rakushow, It's my show!"
3. "Chotto Sokomade"
4. "Summer Eyes"
5. "Yume with You"
6. "Ahhhhh!"
7. "PaLaLeYa (Sayonara)"
8. "Funk It Up (All Star Street Funk Mix)"
9. "Silkno Aiga Hoshikute"
10. "Too Light to Do"
11. "Just the Two of Us" (featuring Caron Wheeler)
12. "6 to 8
13. "Yoruni Dakarete (A Night in Afro Blue)"
14. "Cymbals"
