= Words and Sounds Tour =

2001 concert tour by Jill Scott

Words And Sounds Tour
- Tour by Jill Scott
- Associated album: Who Is Jill Scott? Words and Sounds Vol. 1
- Start date: January 27, 2001
- End date: August 29, 2001
- Legs: 2
- No. of shows: 52 in North America; 52 in total

Jill Scott concert chronology
- Words and Sounds Tour (2001); Buzz Tour (2004)

Words and Sounds Tour was a music tour in 2001 by American recording artist Jill Scott. The Words and Sounds tour started on January 27, in Atlanta, Georgia through the end of February. By the spring Jill Scott ended her headlining tour during the winter, she was invited to join rock singer Sting on his US tour. Scott was featured as Sting's opening act for his itinerary of shows for the month of May.

Jill Scott was hospitalized for an illness a day after the tour kicked off on May 5, in D.C. She was treated and released with orders to rest for a week, as she would miss the first few shows. She soon recovered and joined Sting on May 15, when the tour arrived in Madison, Wisconsin at the Kohl Center. Scott resumed a North America second leg tour in July with dates scheduled through the summer.

The tour was later packaged and released as a two CD-set entitled Experience: Jill Scott 826+. The August 26, show was recorded at DAR Constitution Hall in Washington, D.C. Disc 1 is the live concert, while disc 2 showcases new material including poetry spoken to music known as "Thickness".

== Opening act ==
- Mike Phillips (North America—Leg 2)

== Set list ==
1. "Jilltro"
2. "A Long Walk"
3. "Love Rain" (Suite)
4. "Slowly Surely"
5. "One Is the Magic #"
6. "Brotha"
7. "Do You Remember"
8. "Gettin' In the Way"
9. "Honey Molasses" ^{1}
10. "It's Love"
11. "The Way"
12. "Said Enough" ^{1}
13. "Thickness" ^{1}
14. "Fatback Taffy/ (Band Introduction)"
15. "He Loves Me (Lyzel in E Flat) / Movements I, II, & III)"

^{1} performed only at select venues

== Band ==
- Musical Director/Keyboards: Pete Kuzma
- Erik Tribbett: Drums
- James Mason: Percussion
- Thaddaeus Tribbett: Bass
- Matt Cappy: Trumpet
- Jeff Bradshaw: Trombone
- Background vocals: Carol Riddick, Vivian Green, Monique Harcum

== Tour dates ==
List of 2001 concerts
Date	City	Country	Venue
January 27, 2001	Atlanta	United States	The Tabernacle
January 29, 2001	Atlanta	United States	The Tabernacle
January 31, 2001	Baltimore	United States	Joseph Meyerhoff Symphony Hall
February 1, 2001	Baltimore	United States	Joseph Meyerhoff Symphony Hall
February 3, 2001	Atlantic City	United States	Tropicana Casino
February 4, 2001	Boston	United States	The Avalon
February 9, 2001	Norfolk	United States	The Boathouse
February 12, 2001	Oakland	United States	Paramount Theatre
February 16, 2001	San Diego	United States	Belly Up
February 17, 2001	Las Vegas	United States	House of Blues
February 21, 2001	Los Angeles	United States	Universal Amphitheatre
February 22, 2001	Los Angeles	United States	Universal Amphitheatre
May 15, 2001	Madison	United States	Kohl Center
May 16, 2001	Peoria	United States	Peoria Civic Center
May 18, 2001	Rosemont	United States	Allstate Arena
May 19, 2001	Auburn Hills	United States	The Palace of Auburn Hills
May 20, 2001	Rochester	United States	Blue Cross Arena
May 22, 2001	Wilkes-Barre	United States	First Union Arena
May 23, 2001	Philadelphia	United States	First Union Center
May 25, 2001	Portland	United States	Cumberland Civic Center
May 26, 2001	Boston	United States	Fleet Center
June 22, 2001	Hampton	United States	Jazz Festival
July 4, 2001	Philadelphia	United States	Welcome America Festival
July 5, 2001	New Orleans	United States	Louisiana Superdome
July 17, 2001	Chicago	United States	Chicago Theatre
July 18, 2001	Chicago	United States	Chicago Theatre
July 20, 2001	Cincinnati	United States	Coors Light Festival
July 21, 2001	Indianapolis	United States	Indiana Expo
July 22, 2001	Minneapolis	United States	Orpheum Theatre
July 25, 2001	Seattle	United States	The Pier
July 27, 2001	Berkeley	United States	Hearst Greek Theatre
July 28, 2001	Los Angeles	United States	Greek Theatre
July 29, 2001	Phoenix	United States	Celebrity Theatre
July 31, 2001	Denver	United States	Fillmore Auditorium
August 2, 2001	Dallas	United States	Bronco Bowl
August 3, 2001	Houston	United States	Arena Place
August 5, 2001	Nashville	United States	Ryman Auditorium
August 6, 2001	St. Louis	United States	The Pageant
August 8, 2001	Clarkston	United States	DTE Energy Music Theatre
August 9, 2001	Cleveland	United States	State Theater
August 11, 2001	Newark	United States	New Jersey Performing Arts Center
August 12, 2001	Newark	United States	New Jersey Performing Arts Center
August 14, 2001	Boston	United States	Fleet Pavilion
August 15, 2001	Baltimore	United States	Pier Six Concert Pavilion
August 17, 2001	Richmond	United States	Landmark Theater
August 18, 2001	Portsmouth	United States	Harbor Center
August 19, 2001	Greensboro	United States	War Memorial Auditorium
August 20, 2001	Pittsburgh	United States	Benedum Center
August 22, 2001	Charlotte	United States	Ovens Auditorium
August 23, 2001	Atlanta	United States	Chastain Park
August 25, 2001	Washington, D.C.	United States	DAR Constitution Hall
August 26, 2001	Washington, D.C.	United States	DAR Constitution Hall
August 29, 2001	Toronto	Canada	Molson Amphitheatre
