= Aitakute Ima =

Single by Misia

from the album Just Ballade
- Released: November 18, 2009
- Studio: Sony Music Studios; Bunkamura Studio; RM Studio
- Genre: R&B; pop; soul
- Length: 6:02
- Label: Ariola Japan
- Songwriters: Misia; Jun Sasaki

Misia singles chronology
"Ginga" / "Itsumademo" (2009)	"Aitakute Ima" (2009)	"Hoshi no Yō ni..." (2009)

Music video
- "Aitakute Ima" on YouTube

Audio sample
- file; help

"Aitakute Ima" (逢(あ)いたくていま; lit. "Missing You Now") is a song recorded by Japanese singer Misia, from her ninth studio album, Just Ballade. It was released by Ariola Japan as the album's sixth single on November 18, 2009. "Aitakute Ima" is the ending theme to the first season of the TBS drama series Jin.

== Background and release ==
"Aitakute Ima" was released five months after the previous double A-side single "Ginga" / "Itsumademo". It is Misia's first Japanese television drama tie-in in five years, since the Singer for Singer track "Hoshizora no Katasumi de" served as theme song to the CX drama series Minna Mukashi wa Kodomo Datta (2004). The first pressing of the physical release came housed in a sleeve case with a see-through cutout. The track was released in truetone format prior to the official release date, in sized-down version on October 18, 2009 and in full on November 9, 2009.

== Composition ==
"Aitakute Ima" was written by Misia, while the composition and arrangement were handled by Jun Sasaki. It is composed in the key of G-flat major and set to a common time tempo of 70 beats per minute. Misia's vocals span from F♯_{3} to C♯_{5}. Akihiko Ishimaru, the producer of Jin, stated that he chose Misia to sing the theme song because, when imagining the music for the series, he pictured her "powerful and bittersweet" voice. In an interview with Excite, Misia explained that one of directives given to her by Ishimaru was to not read the original Jin manga series, in order to avoid giving away potential spoilers in the song, she posits. The lyrics were therefore inspired solely by the story's theme of longing and nostalgia. Musically, Ishimaru requested a ballad that utilizes a major cord and that is "emotional but not dark".

The song was recorded while on the Hoshizora no Live V Just Ballade tour. Misia remarked to Excite that she usually tries to take a few days off from singing before a concert, but had to make do with less vocal rest because of her busy recording schedule. She expressed being surprised that the final vocal take for "Aitakute Ima" turned out so well, despite the less than ideal conditions.

== Critical reception ==
CDJournal described the song as a "punchy piano ballad" that "speaks of the fundamental theme of love across time" and praised it for its "evocative power". The Japan Maritime Daily called the song "a beautiful ballad" and praised Misia's "well-matched soulful vocal performance". "Aitakute Ima" won the Television Drama Academy Award for Best Drama Song, off the strength of its popularity with both viewers and critics. In a nationwide poll conducted by Music Station in April 2011, the song was ranked the 19th most memorable theme song to a TV series.

== Music video ==
As of February 2026, the music video for "Aitakute Ima" is the most viewed music video on Misia's official YouTube channel, with over 96 million views.

== Chart performance ==
"Aitakute Ima" entered the daily Oricon Singles Chart at number 9. It peaked four days later at number 6. The single debuted at number 9 on the weekly Oricon Singles Chart, with 16,000 copies sold in its first week, making it Misia's first top-ten debut in two years, since "Royal Chocolate Flush" in December 2007. "Aitakute Ima" debuted on the Billboard Japan Hot 100 and Hot Singles Sales charts at number 3 and 9, respectively. The song also appeared on iTunes Japan Store and Mora year-end charts, at number 85 and 44, respectively. The single charted for twelve weeks on the Oricon Singles Chart and sold a reported total of 47,000 copies during its run. The song was certified double platinum, for sales of 500,000 truetones, and triple platinum, for sales of 750,000 of single track downloads, by the Recording Industry Association of Japan.

== Track listing ==
No.	Title	Writer(s)	Arranger(s)	Length
1.	"Aitakute Ima" (逢いたくていま, "Missing You Now")	Misia; Jun Sasaki	Sasaki	6:02
2.	"Kuchibiru to Kuchibiru" (唇と唇, "Lip on Lip")	Hinata; Sinkiroh	Tohru Shigemi	4:55
3.	"Love Truly"	Mayumi Satō; Toshiaki Matsumoto	Shigemi	4:14
4.	"Aitakute Ima" (Instrumental)	Sasaki	Sasaki	5:58
Total length:				21:09

== Credits and personnel ==
Personnel

- Lead vocals – Misia
- Backing vocals, backing vocal arrangement – JP
- Songwriting – Misia, Jun Sasaki
- Arrangement, all other instruments – Jun Sasaki
- Orchestral arrangement – Gen Itettsu
- Piano – Tohru Shigemi
- Drums – Fuyu
- Acoustic guitar – Shuhei Yamaguchi
- Electric guitar – Takashi Yamaguchi
- Bass – Takeshi Taneda
- Strings – Gen Ittetsu Strings
- French horn – Hiroyuki Minami, Hiroyuki Nakajima
- Flute – Hideyo Takakuwa
- Harp – Tomoyuki Asakawa
- Engineering – Masahiro Kawaguchi, Ken Nishi
- Mixing – Masahiro Kawaguchi
- Mastering – Herb Powers Jr.

== Charts ==
Chart (2009–17)	Peak position
Japan Daily Singles (Oricon)	6
Japan Weekly Singles (Oricon)	9
Japan Monthly Singles (Oricon)	21
Japan Hot 100 (Billboard)	3
Japan Adult Contemporary Airplay (Billboard)	10
Japan Hot Top Airplay (Billboard)	3
Japan Hot Singles Sales (Billboard)	9
Japan Download Songs (Billboard)	25
Japan Streaming Songs (Billboard)	20
Japan Weekly Singles (SoundScan)	12
Japan Yearly Albums (Mora)	44
Taiwan Weekly J-pop Albums (Five Music)	19

== Certifications ==
Region	Certification	Certified units/sales
Japan	—	47,000
Japan (RIAJ) single track	Million	1,000,000^{*}
Japan (RIAJ) Ringtone	2× Platinum	500,000^{*}
Japan (RIAJ) Streaming	Platinum	100,000,000^{†}
^{*} Sales figures based on certification alone.^{†} Streaming-only figures based on certification alone.

== Release history ==
Region	Date	Format(s)	Label	Ref.
Japan	November 18, 2009	CD; digital download	Ariola Japan	
Taiwan	December 4, 2009	CD	Sony Music Taiwan	
