= Koe ni Dekinai =

Single by Toshinobu Kubota

from the album Gold Skool
- Released: September 28, 2011
- Recorded: 2011
- Genre: R&B
- Length: 4:17
- Label: SME Records
- Songwriter(s): Toshinobu Kubota
- Producer(s): Toshinobu Kubota

Toshinobu Kubota singles chronology
"Nagareboshi to Koi no Ame" (2011)	"Koe ni Dekinai" (2011)	"Bring me up!" (2013)

Music video
- "Koe ni Dekinai" on YouTube

"Koe ni Dekinai" (声にできない; lit. "I Can't Put Into Words") is a song recorded by Japanese R&B singer Toshinobu Kubota for his sixteenth studio album, Gold Skool (2011). The song was released on September 28, 2011, as the second single from the album.

== Background ==
"Koe ni Dekinai" was written, composed, and produced by Kubota. It served as the theme song for the 2011 Japanese film Yoake no Machi de. The English version of the song appears on the album Gold Skool. The Japanese version of the song appears on Kubota's compilation album The Baddest: Hit Parade.

The B-side, "Koe ni Dekinai (Yoake no Machi de version)", is the version of the original song featured on the soundtrack of the film Yoake no Machi de. The limited edition of the single included a DVD featuring an acoustic performance of the song, with Depapepe playing the acoustic guitar.

== Music video ==
Kubota and Tao in the music video (Koe ni Dekinai)

In 2011, Kubota shot a music video for the song. The video setting begins in a cube-shaped building with several rooms. In the first room is where Kubota resides, and in the second room lies Kubota's love interest (played by Chinese actress In Tao). They are both trying to find the exit to their room, in order to be together. But as Kubota discovers his exit moves to the room, Tao also discovers her exit and enters into the next room (where Kubota had been). As she runs to meet Kubota before the next door closes, the door knob disappears and she is once again trapped in a room alone. In the next scene, they are seen be able to see each other through a see-through wall but are still separated (both remaining in a separate room).

== Chart performance ==
The song opened up on the Oricon Daily Singles at number 13. The song later moved back to the number 20 position, selling 3,287 copies in Japan. The song also charted at number 20 on the Oricon Weekly Singles chart, number 25 on the RIAJ Digital Tracks chart, and number 23 on the Billboard Japan Hot 100 chart.

== Track listing ==
- CD
1. Koe ni Dekinai
2. Koe ni Dekinai (Yoake no Machi de version)
3. Koe ni Dekinai (Karaoke)
- DVD
1. Koe ni Dekinai (Organic Jam with Depapepe)

== Charts and certifications ==
Release	Chart	Peak position	Sales total	Chart run
September 28, 2011	Japan Oricon Daily Singles Chart	13	3,287	3
September 28, 2011	Japan Oricon Weekly Singles Chart	20	3,287	4
September 28, 2011	Japan Billboard Hot 100	23	3,287	1
September 28, 2011	RIAJ Digital Tracks	25	3,287	1
