= Toshinobu Kubota Greatest Hits =

Compilation album by Toshinobu Kubota
- Released: 1998
- Genre: R&B, pop
- Length: 74:13
- Label: Sony Music Entertainment Hong Kong

Toshinobu Kubota chronology
La La La Love Thang (1996)	Toshinobu Kubota Greatest Hits (1998)	The Best of Kubota Toshinobu (1999)

Toshinobu Kubota Greatest Hits is the third series of greatest hits compilations by Japanese singer Toshinobu Kubota. The album was only released in 1998 in Hong Kong on the Sony Music Entertainment Hong Kong recording label.

== Track listing ==
1. "Ahhhhh!"
2. "La La La Love Song" (featuring Naomi Campbell)
3. "Cry On Your Smile"
4. "Missing"
5. "Amaoto"
6. "Dance If You Want It"
7. "Honey B"
8. "Mayonakano Taiyo"
9. "Just the Two of Us (So So Def Remix)" (featuring Caron Wheeler)
10. "Telephoto"
11. "Shoot the Hoop!"
12. "Love Reborn (Kc's "What'Cha Gonna Do?" Remix)"
13. "La La La Love Song (Midnight Piano Version)"
