= Yakusoku no Tsubasa =

Single by Misia

from the album Just Ballade
- Released: May 28, 2008
- Recorded: 2007–08
- Genre: Pop, R&B
- Length: 5:19
- Label: BMG Japan
- Songwriters: Misia, Jun Sasaki
- Producer: Sasaki

Misia singles chronology
"Yes Forever" (2008)	"Yakusoku no Tsubasa" (2008)	"Catch the Rainbow" (2008)

Music video
- "Yakusoku no Tsubasa" on YouTube

"Yakusoku no Tsubasa" (約束の翼; lit. "Wings of the Promise") is the twentieth single by Japanese recording artist Misia. It was released on May 28, 2008 as the second single from Misia's ninth studio album Just Ballade.

== Overview ==
The single was released as the second of a set of three releases planned for a three-month period. The first press edition comes housed in a cardboard sleeve and includes a 720mm×477mm poster of the cover artwork, which features Misia holding two lilies and posing on her knees with wings of steel attached to her back, reminiscent of the angel in the Annunciation by Leonardo da Vinci. The wings, designed by Tokyo-based stainless steel artist Nobuyuki Yoshimoto, were subsequently recreated on the back of a prop chair on which Misia sat to perform the song during The Tour of Misia Discotheque Asia.

"Yakusoku no Tsubasa"
A 30-second sample of the second pre-chorus of "Yakusoku no Tsubasa."

"Yakusoku no Tsubasa" was written by Misia and composed and produced by Jun Sasaki. It was penned for the movie Cyborg She, starring Haruka Ayase and Keisuke Koide. At a press conference for the film, the director, Kwak Jae-yong, explained his choice of theme song:

The movie runs the panoply of emotions — from love to sadness to sorrow to exhilaration — and by having this song play at the end, the main focus is brought back to love, which is why it is perfect for the film.

The B-side, "So Beautiful," was written by Misia, composed by Toshiaki Matsumoto and produced by Tohru Shigemi. The single includes two remixes, one of "Any Love", remixed by producer Sinkiroh himself, and one of "To Be in Love," remixed by Studio Apartment. Also included is a live version of "Yakusoku no Tsubasa," recorded during the Hoshizora no Live IV Classics tour.

== Chart performance ==
"Yakusoku no Tsubasa" debuted on the Oricon Daily Singles chart at number 8 and peaked at number 12 on the Oricon Weekly Singles chart, with 8,042 copies sold in its first week. The single charted for five weeks and sold a total of 13,095 copies.

== Track listing ==
All lyrics are written by Misia.

No.	Title	Music	Length
1.	"Yakusoku no Tsubasa" (約束の翼 "Wings of the Promise")	Jun Sasaki	5:19
2.	"So Beautiful"	Toshiaki Matsumoto	5:14
3.	"Any Love (Sinkiroh Encore Mix)"	Sinkiroh	4:50
4.	"To Be in Love (Studio Apartment Remix)"	Joi	9:16
5.	"Yakusoku no Tsubasa (Hoshizora no Live IV)" (約束の翼 (星空のライヴIV))	Sasaki	5:25
Total length:			30:04

== Charts ==
Chart (2008)	Peak position
Billboard Japan Hot 100	4
Billboard Japan Hot Top Airplay	3
Oricon Daily Singles	8
Oricon Weekly Singles	12
Oricon Yearly Singles	481
SoundScan Japan Weekly Singles (Limited Edition)	17
Taiwan Five Music J-pop/K-pop Chart	13

== Release history ==
Region	Date	Format	Label
Japan	May 28, 2008	CD, digital download	BMG Japan
Hong Kong	July 4, 2008	CD	Sony Music Entertainment
Taiwan	August 1, 2008	CD	Sony Music Entertainment
