= Love Rain (Toshinobu Kubota song) =

"Love Rain (Koi no Ame)"

Single by Toshinobu Kubota

from the album Love & Rain: Love Songs
- Released: June 6, 2010
- Recorded: 2010
- Genre: R&B, pop
- Length: 4:52
- Label: SME Records
- Songwriter: Toshinobu Kubota

Toshinobu Kubota singles chronology
"Star Light" (2010)	"Love Rain (Koi no Ame)" (2010)	"Nagareboshi to Koi no Ame" (2011)

Music video
- "Love Rain (Koi no Ame)" on YouTube

"Love Rain (Koi no Ame)" is a song recorded by Japanese R&B singer Toshinobu Kubota for his compilation album, Love & Rain: Love Songs (2010). The song was released on June 6, 2010, as the lead single from the album.

== Background ==
"Love Rain (Koi no Ame)" was written and produced by Kubota, and arranged by Yoichiro Kakizaki. It served as the theme song for the Japanese TV drama Tsuki no Koibito ~Moon Lovers~. It is noted that the English version of the song appears on the album Gold Skool. The song also appears on Kubota's compilation album The Baddest: Hit Parade. On July 19, 2010, Kubota performed the song alongside the Bank Band at the AP Bank Fes' 2010. The performance was featured the Bank Band's concert DVD "Live & Documentary DVD: Ap Bank Fes '10".

The B-side, "Timeless Affection", is the full version of the interlude songs featured on Kubota's fifteenth album Timeless Fly.

== Music video ==
Kubota in the music video "Love Rain (Koi no Ame)".

Kubota also shot a music video for "Love Rain (Koi no Ame)". The music video began with Kubota singing in an empty room on a pedestal on stage, while video recording his performance. He is later seen video recording himself before a huge open comic book sketch. Kubota is also seen in a forest during night time. Other scene during the music video include the usage of video shots of many comic book sketches shown throughout the music video.

== Chart performance ==
The song charted at number 3 on the Oricon Daily Singles and number 3 on the Oricon Weekly Singles chart, selling 22,000 copies in the first week of its release. "Love Rain (Koi no Ame)" also chart at number 5 on Billboard Japan Hot 100 chart. During the week of June 16 to June 22, 2010, the song also peaked at number 1 on the RIAJ Digital Tracks chart.

== Track listing ==
- CD Single
1. Love Rain (Koi no Ame)
2. Timeless Affection (Full version)
3. Love Rain (Koi no Ame) (Instrumental)

== Charts and certifications ==
Weekly chart performance for "Love Rain"
Release	Chart	Peak position	Sales total
June 6, 2010	Japan Oricon Daily Singles Chart	3	500,000
June 6, 2010	Japan Oricon Weekly Singles Chart	3	500,000
June 6, 2010	Japan Oricon Yearly Singles Chart	14	500,000
June 6, 2010	Japan Billboard Hot 100	5	500,000
June 6, 2010	RIAJ Digital Track Chart	1	500,000

Annual chart rankings for "Love Rain"
Chart (2010)	Rank
Japan Adult Contemporary (Billboard)	50
