= Ginga / Itsumademo =

"Ginga/Itsumademo"

Single by Misia

from the album Just Ballade
- Released: June 10, 2009
- Recorded: 2008–09
- Genre: Pop, R&B
- Length: 4:38 ("Ginga"); 1:32 ("Itsumademo")
- Label: BMG Japan
- Songwriters: Misia, Shusui, Fredrik Hult, Carl Utbult, Tebey, Sinkiroh
- Producers: Utbult, Hult, Sinkiroh

Misia singles chronology
"Catch the Rainbow" (2008)	"Ginga/Itsumademo" (2009)	"Aitakute Ima" (2009)

Music video
- "Ginga" on YouTube

"Ginga/Itsumademo" (銀河/いつまでも; lit. "Galaxy/Forever") is the twenty-second single by Japanese recording artist Misia. It was released on June 10, 2009, as the third single from Misia's ninth studio album Just Ballade.

== Overview ==
"Ginga/Itsumademo" was released simultaneously with The Tour of Misia Discotheque Asia concert DVD and is Misia's first double A-side single since "Luv Parade/Color of Life" (2006). The first pressing of the single comes housed in a sleeve case and includes a bonus photo book comprising pictures from Misia's Discotheque Asia tour. The first press edition also included a special code which allowed fans to stream the fan club-only live concert Hoshizora no Etude Just Ballade, held on July 7, 2009, to celebrate Misia's birthday.

"Ginga" was written by Misia, composed by Shusui and co-composed and produced by Swedish songwriters Fredrik Hult and Carl Utbult. "Itsumademo" was also written by Misia and composed and produced by Sinkiroh. In an interview with The Japan Times, Misia revealed that the inspiration behind "Ginga" was her late grandfather. She elaborated:

"Ginga"
A 24-second sample of the chorus of "Ginga" used in the Sekkisei Supreme commercial.

"Itsumademo"
A 28-second sample of the first chorus of "Itsumademo."

("Ginga") is related to my recent experiences, but the most inspiring thing for me was meeting my grandfather. It might be the last time I see him. I told him that I would never be able to thank him enough. I thanked him for taking me out for a walk when I was a child, for teaching me how to fold origami and make shadow pictures, and for telling me stories. I couldn't stop saying thank you.

Both A-sides were featured in commercials for Kose cosmetics Sekkisei Supreme and Sekkisei, respectively, starring Nanako Matsushima. When asked about the use of "Ginga" in the commercials, Matsushima commented:

Misia has written many songs that have been used in dramas and commercials I have starred in. This song ("Ginga"), which also showcases her powerful range, has helped me broaden my horizons. I always feel energized by Misia's sweet and positive songs.

In addition to being the theme song of Misia's Hoshizora no Live V Just Ballade tour, "Ginga" was also chosen as the official image song for the International Year of Astronomy and its music video, which features the position, size and distance data of stars and other celestial bodies, presented in 4-D, was created in collaboration with the National Astronomical Observatory of Japan. The song "Sukoshi Zutsu Taisetsu ni", which was previously released as a standalone digital single, was included as a B-side.

== Chart performance ==
"Ginga/Itsumademo" debuted on the Oricon Daily Singles chart at number 11 and peaked at number 15 on the Oricon Weekly Singles chart, with 6,319 copies sold in its first week. The single charted for six weeks and sold a total of 9,930 copies.

== Track listing ==
All lyrics are written by Misia.

No.	Title	Music	Length
1.	"Ginga" (銀河 "Galaxy")	Shusui, Fredrik Hult, Carl Utbult, Tebey	4:38
2.	"Itsumademo" (いつまでも "Forever")	Sinkiroh	1:32
3.	"Sukoshi Zutsu Taisetsu ni"	Sinkiroh	5:13
4.	"Sukoshi Zutsu Taisetsu ni (Gomi's the World is Waiting for a Change Mix)"	Sinkiroh	7:59
5.	"Ginga (Instrumental)"	Shusui, Hult, Utbult, Tebey	4:37
6.	"Sukoshi Zutsu Taisetsu ni (Instrumental)"	Sinkiroh	5:08
Total length:			29:07

== Charts ==
Chart (2009)	Peak position
Billboard Japan Hot 100	9
Billboard Japan Hot Top Airplay	7
Billboard Japan Hot Singles Sales	17
Oricon Daily Singles	11
Oricon Weekly Singles	15
SoundScan Japan Weekly Singles	19
Taiwan Five Music J-pop/K-pop Chart	9
Taiwan G-Music J-pop Chart	13

== Release history ==
Region	Date	Format	Label
Japan	June 10, 2009	CD, digital download	BMG Japan
Taiwan	June 12, 2009	CD	Sony Music Entertainment
Hong Kong	June 15, 2009	CD	Sony Music Entertainment
