= Gold Skool =

Studio album by Toshinobu Kubota
- Released: August 3, 2011
- Recorded: 2011
- Genre: R&B, pop, dance, soul
- Length: 55:07
- Label: SME Records (Sony Music Entertainment Japan), Mastersix Foundation
- Producer: Toshinobu Kubota

Toshinobu Kubota chronology
Love & Rain: Love Songs (2010)	Gold Skool (2011)	The Baddest: Hit Parade (2011)

Singles from Gold Skool
- 1. "Nagareboshi to Koi no Ame" Released: July 13, 2011; 2. "Koe ni Dekinai" Released: September 28, 2011

Gold Skool is the sixteenth studio album of Japanese singer Toshinobu Kubota, released on August 3, 2011. The album charted at number 3 on the Oricon Albums chart and remained on the charts for total of 18 weeks. The album sold over 78,124 units in Japan.

== Release and promotion ==
In collaboration with Sony Music Entertainment Japan and Mastersix Foundation, Gold Skool was first released in Japan on August 3, 2011. On the same day of its release, a limited edition of the album was released, which featured an exclusive DVD. The album debuted at number 3 on the Oricon Weekly Albums chart and remained on the chart for total of eighteen weeks. Gold Skool also charted at number 7 on the Oricon Monthly Albums chart and at number 79 on the Oricon Yearly Albums chart, selling over 33,000 copies in its first week of release.

=== Singles ===
Nagareboshi to Koi no Ame was released July 13, 2011. The song commemorate Kubota's twenty-five years in the music industry. The single charted at number 15 on the Oricon Daily Singles chart, selling 2,727 copies in its first week. The song also charted at number 7 on the Billboard Japan Hot 100 Songs chart. The second single "Koe ni Dekinai" was released on September 28, 2011. The song opened up on the Oricon Daily Singles at number 13. The song later moved back to the number 20 position, selling 3,287 copies in Japan. The song also charted at number 20 on the Oricon Weekly Singles chart, number 25 on the RIAJ Digital Tracks chart, and number 23 on the Billboard Japan Hot 100 chart. Although unreleased as an official single, the song "Golden Smile", featuring Exile group member Atsushi, chart at number 1 on the RIAJ Digital Tracks chart.

=== Tour ===
In October 2011, Kubota began the Gold Skool Tour. The tour schedule twenty-eight performance dates. The tour began on October 7, 2011, at Misato City Culture Hall in Saitama, Japan. The tour officially concluded on December 25, 2011, where Kubota performed at Fukuoka City Hall for the second time during the tour. After the tour ended, Kubota began the "Party Ain't A Party Tour" in January 2012. A special performance was recorded at National Yoyogi Stadium in Tokyo on January 21 and 22. The performance was released on DVD and Blu-ray under the title "Party Ain't A Party" on May 30, 2012. The concert DVD charted at number 5 on the Oricon DVD charts.

== Track list ==
Standard edition

1. "Gold Skool: Foreplay"
2. "Jungle Love"
3. "Wednesday Lounge"
4. "Winds"
5. "Prisoner"
6. "Golden Smile" (featuring Exile Atsushi)
7. "Gold Skool: The Play"
8. "Still In My Mind"
9. "Tick Tock"
10. "Rn'B Healing"
11. "Umi e Kinasai"
12. "Nagareboshi to Koi no Ame"
13. "Koe ni Dekinai" (English version)

DVD track list

1. "Kubota Toshinobu no Yukai na Gold Days"
2. "Jacket Shooting"
3. "Golden Smile (Recording Document Full version)" (featuring Exile Atsushi)

== Charts ==
=== Oricon Sales Chart ===
Release	Chart
Oricon Weekly Albums Chart	3
Oricon Monthly Albums Chart	7
Oricon Yearly Albums Chart	79
