= Flying Easy Loving Crazy =

Single by Toshinobu Kubota featuring Misia

from the album Timeless Fly
- Released: March 26, 2008
- Genre: R&B
- Length: 5:29
- Label: Mastersix Foundation
- Songwriter(s): Toshinobu Kubota
- Producer(s): Toshinobu Kubota

Toshinobu Kubota singles chronology
"Magic" (2007)	"Flying Easy Loving Crazy" (2008)	"Tomorrow Waltz" (2010)

Misia singles chronology
"Royal Chocolate Flush" (2007)	"Flying Easy Loving Crazy" (2008)	"Yes Forever" (2008)

Music video
- "Flying Easy Loving Crazy" on YouTube

"Flying Easy Loving Crazy" (stylized as "FLYING EASY LOVING CRAZY") is a song recorded by Japanese singer-songwriter Toshinobu Kubota and Japanese singer Misia for Kubota's fifteenth studio album Timeless Fly. It was released by Mastersix Foundation as the album's second single on March 26, 2008.

== Background ==
"Flying Easy Loving Crazy" is the second in a series of collaborative singles released by Kubota. The song, which features guest vocals by Japanese singer Misia, whom Kubota has worked with in the past on the album Singer for Singer (2004), was written, composed and produced by Kubota and arranged by Daisuke Mori. It was used in the promotional campaign of the Cirque du Soleil production Dralion, dubbed Daihatsu Dralion in Japan. Kubota describes "Flying Easy Loving Crazy" as "courage, freedom, and colorfulness bloomed into a love song." In a press release, Misia commented that "during recording, it felt like Kubota's unique rhythm and melodies had opened up the doors to a new world." Kubota and Misia performed the song together twice at Misia's two-date Take Action! benefit concert tour, held at the Yokohama Blitz on May 26–27, 2008.

== Chart performance ==
"Flying Easy Loving Crazy" entered the daily Oricon Singles Chart at number 10 and debuted at number 18 on the weekly chart, with 6,000 copies sold in its first week. The single charted for six weeks and sold a reported total of 11,000 copies.

== Track listing ==
All tracks are written by Toshinobu Kubota.

No.	Title	Arranger(s)	Length
1.	"Flying Easy Loving Crazy"	Daisuke Mori	5:29
2.	"Babylon Lovers"	Yōichirō Kakizaki	4:18
3.	"Flying Easy Loving Crazy" (Instrumental)	Mori	5:30
Total length:			15:17

== Charts ==
Chart (2008)	Peak position	Sales
Japan Daily Singles (Oricon)	20	11,000
Japan Weekly Singles (Oricon)	18	11,000
Japan Weekly Singles (SoundScan)	18	11,000
Japan Hot 100 (Billboard)	26	11,000
Japan Hot Singles Sales (Billboard)	14	11,000
