= Sukoshi Zutsu, Taisetsu ni =

Single by Misia

from the album Just Ballade
- Released: February 4, 2009
- Recorded: 2008; RM Studio (Tokyo), Onkio Haus, Bass Hit Studio (New York)
- Genre: Pop
- Length: 5:13
- Label: BMG Japan
- Composer(s): Sinkiroh
- Lyricist(s): Misia
- Producer(s): Tohru Shigemi

"Sukoshi Zutsu, Taisetsu ni" (少しずつ 大切に, lit. "Little by Little, with Care") is a song by Japanese recording artist Misia. It was released as a digital single in Chaku-Uta format on February 4, 2009. The song was first introduced during The Tour of Misia Discotheque Asia. Later, it was handpicked to be the theme song for the TBS TV special Kandō! Kita no Daishizen Special 'Mori no Love Letter' Kuramoto Sō ga Okuru, Hateshinai Inochi no Monogatari. The song was subsequently released as a B-side on Misia's twenty-second single "Ginga/Itsumademo."

== Track listing ==
Digital download
No.	Title	Lyrics	Music	Length
1.	"Sukoshi Zutsu, Taisetsu ni" (少しずつ 大切に "Little by Little, with Care")	Misia	Sinkiroh	5:13

== Charts ==
Chart (2009)	Peak position
Billboard Japan Hot 100	42
