= Catch the Rainbow (Misia song) =

Single by Misia
- Released: December 17, 2008
- Recorded: 2008
- Genre: Pop, dance, R&B
- Length: 4:22
- Label: BMG Japan
- Songwriters: Misia, Sakoshin
- Producer: Sakoshin

Misia singles chronology
"Yakusoku no Tsubasa" (2008)	"Catch the Rainbow" (2008)	"Ginga/Itsumademo" (2009)

"Catch the Rainbow" is the twenty-first single by Japanese recording artist Misia.

== Background ==
The song "Catch the Rainbow" was first released digitally Asia-wide on August 30, 2008. It was later released as a physical CD single on December 17, 2008. "Catch the Rainbow" is Misia's only non-album single. It was released in support of Misia's first Asia tour The Tour of Misia Discotheque Asia. The first press edition of the single comes in Super High Material CD (SHM-CD) format and includes a bonus DVD, which features footage from The Tour of Misia Discotheque Asia, as well as the "Catch the Rainbow" music video.

"Catch the Rainbow" was written by Misia, while the composition and production were handled by long-time collaborator Sakoshin. The B-side, "Joyful Moment", was also written by Misia, composed by Gomi and Shusui and produced by Gomi. The single includes six remixes of different genres including electropop, hip hop and house.

== Chart performance ==
"Catch the Rainbow" debuted on the Oricon Daily Singles chart at number 6 and peaked at number 11 on the Oricon Weekly Singles chart, with 7,271 copies sold in its first week. The single charted for seven weeks and sold 12,150 copies in total.

== Track listing ==
All lyrics are written by Misia.

No.	Title	Music	Remixer(s)	Length
1.	"Catch the Rainbow"	Sakoshin		4:22
2.	"Joyful Moment"	Gomi, Shusui		6:13
3.	"Catch the Rainbow (Sakoshin 808 Mix)"	Sakoshin	Sakoshin	4:54
4.	"Catch the Rainbow (Mega Raiders Electro Mix)"	Sakoshin	Mega Raiders	4:56
5.	"Catch the Rainbow (Mega Raiders Floor Mix)"	Sakoshin	Mega Raiders	3:30
6.	"Catch the Rainbow (The Lowbrows "Turn Up the Bass" Remix)"	Sakoshin	The Lowbrows	4:42
7.	"Catch the Rainbow (The Lowbrows "Turn Up the Bass" Dub)"	Sakoshin	The Lowbrows	3:17
8.	"Catch the Rainbow (Gomi's Old School Remix)"	Sakoshin	Gomi	6:01
Total length:				37:55

First press edition DVD
No.	Title	Length
1.	"The Trailer Movie (The Tour of Misia Discotheque Asia)"
2.	"Catch the Rainbow (Video Clip)"
3.	"Tribe Radio Show"
4.	"Dancer's Eye"
5.	"Misia's Eye"

== Charts ==
Chart (2008)	Peak position
Billboard Japan Hot 100	2
Billboard Japan Hot Top Airplay	1
Billboard Japan Hot Singles Sales	15
Oricon Daily Singles	6
Oricon Weekly Singles	11
SoundScan Japan Weekly Singles (CD+DVD)	18
Taiwan Five Music J-pop/K-pop Chart	16
Taiwan G-Music J-pop Chart	14

== Release history ==
Region	Date	Format	Label
Asiawide	August 30, 2008	Digital download	Sony Music Entertainment
Japan	December 17, 2008	CD, CD+DVD, digital download	BMG Japan
Taiwan	December 19, 2008	CD+DVD	Sony Music Entertainment
Hong Kong	December 31, 2008	CD+DVD	Sony Music Entertainment
