= Love Rain (Jill Scott song) =

Single by Jill Scott featuring Mos Def

from the album Who Is Jill Scott?: Words and Sounds Vol. 1
- Released: July 18, 2000
- Genre: R&B; hip hop; spoken word
- Label: Hidden Beach/Epic
- Songwriters: Jill Scott; Vidal Davis

Jill Scott featuring Mos Def singles chronology
"Love Rain" (2000)	"Gettin' In the Way" (2000)

"Love Rain" is the debut single by Jill Scott. Co-written with Vidal Davis, the soul song describes a young couple's summer romance, including sexually graphic lyrics and weather metaphors. Scott employs spoken word as well as breathy and syncopated vocals, while a remix includes a verse by American rapper Mos Def.

The song was released as the lead single from Scott's debut album, Who Is Jill Scott?: Words and Sounds Vol. 1, in July 18, 2000. Upon its release, the single was well received by critics, who praised Scott's vocals and songwriting, and compared her performance to those of Erykah Badu, Macy Gray, and Prince. Although the song's promotion was limited, and it received no music video, it was credited with building buzz for Scott and for her next single, the more successful "Gettin' In the Way". Scott included a re-imagined version of the song in the set of her 2001 live album, Experience: Jill Scott 826+.

== Composition ==
"Love Rain" is one of several tracks from Scott's debut album to discuss love, employing weather metaphors to describe a new relationship. The first verse profiles a couple dating in Philadelphia, Scott's hometown, and describes their activities: talking, taking walks, and having sex. The second verse adopts a more graphic tone, with Scott employing syncopated vocals to sing the lines "Love slipped from my lips/Dripped down my chin and landed in his lap/And us became new [...] Made the coochie easy and the obvious invisible". Ultimately, the song reveals that the relationship is not as ideal as it first appears, with Scott singing that "wide open loose/the mistake was made".

Critic Mark Anthony Neal, writing for PopMatters, interpreted the song as being "a lament about falling too deeply, too quickly, too emphatically in infatuation". Neal deemed the song the "nastiest" track on the album, pointing to the lyric "like bowels after collard greens". For the live version of the song, included on Scott's live album Experience: Jill Scott 826+, Scott performed the song and improvised scat. Scott further re-interprets the song by emphasizing the line "you broke me be I'm healing" and turning the song into a "suite of recovery and resistance".

== Release ==
"Love Rain" was released as the lead single from Who Is Jill Scott?: Words & Sounds, Vol. 1 in May 2000. On May 24, a promotional 12" containing the Mos Def remix was sent to mix shows and dance clubs, while it was sent to radio in June 2000. A CD single of the original, solo version was released on July 4, 2000. In addition to a live solo version, included on Experience: Jill Scott 826+, two remixes featuring American rapper Mos Def were included on Scott's 2007 compilation Collaborations.

The Mos Def remix was released to radio concurrently with "Gettin' In the Way". In an August 2000 column for Billboard, columnist Stephanie Lopez suggested that the sole purpose of the song's release was to "stir street recognition" of Scott. Lopez further noted that the "buzz" generated by "Love Rain" was benefiting "Gettin' In the Way", which rose into the top 75 of the Hot R&B/Hip-Hop Songs chart the week of her column. The song did not receive a music video.

== Critical reception ==
In the July 8, 2000, issue of Billboard, Who Is Jill Scott?: Words & Sounds, Vol. 1 was reviewed favorably and received a "spotlight" designation, while the review named "Love Rain" a "standout" of the album. Also in that issue, a critic for the Dance Trax Hot Plate deemed the remix a "delicious slab of funky soul", comparing Scott's style to that of Erykah Badu and Macy Gray. AllMusic and music critic Robert Christgau likewise considered the track an album highlight. Sal Cinquemani, writing for Slant, described the song as "drenched in thick beats and poetic sex" and commented that "Prince would be both proud and aroused" by the "love slipped from my lips" line. In a 2018 retrospective, Okayplayer highlighted the "love slipped from my lips" lyrics when ranking the song as one of "Eight Times Jill Scott Celebrated Sexuality Through Song". Also in 2018, rapper Mick Jenkins analyzed the song for the Pitchfork "Favorite Verse" series, arguing that the song's spoken-word segments should be considered rap.

== See also ==
List of songs recorded by Mos Def
