= La La La Love Thang =

Studio album by Toshinobu Kubota
- Released: December 2, 1996
- Recorded: 1995–1996
- Genre: R&B, pop, soul
- Length: 55:38
- Label: Sony Music Entertainment Japan
- Producer: Toshinobu Kubota, Yoichiro Kakizaki

Toshinobu Kubota chronology
Sunshine, Moonlight (1995)	La La La Love Thang (1996)	Toshinobu Kubota Greatest Hits (1998)

Singles from La La La Love Thang
- 1. "Niji no Grand Slam" Released: July 7, 1995; 2. "La La La Love Song" Released: May 5, 1996; 3. "Body-Cation" Released: October 10, 1996

La La La Love Thang is the ninth studio album of Japanese singer Toshinobu Kubota, released on December 2, 1996. The album has been certified triple platinum by the Recording Industry Association of Japan. It was also successful in international music markets and yielded two singles: "Niji No Grand Slam" and "La La La Love Song". Kubota then embarked on his first international concert tour in 1996, which he titled the Oyeees! Tour. A live album, Toshinobu Kubota Concert Tour '96: Oyeees!, was released which featured footage from the tour. As of February 2012, La La La Love Thang has sold over 840,000 copies worldwide.

== Background ==
In early 1995, Kubota began the recording sessions for ninth album. Kubota produced the entire album (with the exception of La La La Love Song). He worked with only one other producer Yoichiro Kakizaki, who produced "La La La Love Song".

On July 7, 1995, Kubota released the lead single "Niji No Grand Slam". The single charted at number 15 on Oricon Weekly Singles chart. In May 1996, Kubota released the second single "La La La Love Song", which featured English model Naomi Campbell. The song charted at number 1 on the Oricon Daily Singles chart and Oricon Weekly Singles chart. The single went on sell over two million copies worldwide and became a certified two-million seller.

On December 2, 1996, La La La Love Thang was released. The album charted at number 2 on the Oricon Albums chart and remained on the charts for total of 28 weeks. In late 1996, Kubota began the Oyeees! Tour. The tour was to promote the albums "Bumpin' Voyage", "Sunshine, Moonlight", and "La La La Love Thang". This was Kubota's first nationwide tour, which lasted for the remainder of 1996. During his performance at Yoyogi Daiichi Taiikukan in 1996, the show was filmed.

In March 1997, Kubota released his live concert album, Toshinobu Kubota Concert Tour '96: Oyeees!, on VHS and DVD. La La La Love Thang also went on to chart at number 26 on the Oricon Yearly Albums chart. As of 2012, the album was triple platinum in Japan, selling over 840,000 copies worldwide.

== Track listing ==
1. "Chotto Soko Made"
2. "Body-Cation"
3. "Summer Eyes"
4. "Ura Mado"
5. "La La La Love Song" (featuring Naomi Campbell)
6. "Not Too Nice"
7. "Silk No Ai Ga Hoshikutte"
8. "What's The Wonder?"
9. "Club Planet"
10. "Niji No Grand Slam"
11. "La La La Love Song (Piano Version)"

== Personnel ==
- Backing Vocals – Audrey Wheeler, Craig Derry, James "D-Train" Williams
- Drum programming – Yoichiro Kakizaki
- Guitar – Itaru Sakota, Jeff Mironov, Toshinobu Kubota, Yoichiro Kakizaki
- Keyboards – Philip Woo, Yoichiro Kakizaki
- Lyrics By – Toshinobu Kubota
- Mastered by – Ted Jensen
- Mixed by – Mick Guzauski
- Music by – Toshinobu Kubota
- Percussion – Bashiri Johnson
- Producer, Backing Vocals – Toshinobu Kubota
- Recorded by – David O'Donnell, Hiroshi Miyauchi
- Synthesizer – Itaru Sakota

== Charts ==
=== Oricon Sales Chart ===
Release	Chart
Oricon Weekly Albums Chart	2
Oricon Yearly Albums Chart	26
