= Timeless Fly =

Studio album by Toshinobu Kubota
- Released: February 24, 2010
- Recorded: 2007–2009
- Genre: R&B, soul
- Length: 61:32
- Label: SME Records (Sony Music Entertainment Japan), Mastersix Foundation
- Producer: Toshinobu Kubota, UTA, Daisuke Mori, Kreva, Yoichiro Kakizaki, Icedown, Ali-Kick (Romancrew), G.M. Kaz

Toshinobu Kubota chronology
| For Real? (2006) | Timeless Fly (2010) | Love & Rain: Love Songs (2010) |

Singles from Timeless Fly
- 1. "M☆A☆G☆I☆C" Released: August 8, 2007; 2. "Flying Easy Loving Crazy" Released: March 26, 2008; 3. "Tomorrow Waltz" Released: January 27, 2010; 4. "Star Light" Released: January 27, 2010

Timeless Fly is the fifteenth studio album of Japanese singer Toshinobu Kubota, released on February 24, 2010. The album charted at number 9 on the Oricon Albums chart and remained on the charts for total of 26 weeks. The album sold over 16,063 units in Japan.

== Release and promotion ==
In collaboration with Sony Music Entertainment Japan and Mastersix Foundation, Timeless Fly was first released in Japan on February 24, 2010. On the same day of its release, a limited edition of the album was released, which featured an exclusive DVD.

=== Singles ===
"M☆A☆G☆I☆C", featuring Kreva, was released on August 8, 2007, as the album's lead single. "Flying Easy Loving Crazy", featuring Misia, was serviced to international markets as the second international single from Timeless Fly. "Flying Easy Loving Crazy" was released on March 26, 2008. The song, featuring Japanese R&B singer Misia, whom Kubota has worked with in the past, was written and composed by Kubota. It served as image song for the Japanese promotional campaign of the Cirque du Soleil production Dralion, Daihatsu Dralion in Japan. The B-side, "Babylon Lovers," is performed by Kubota alone.

The album's second single "Flying Easy Loving Crazy" debuted on the Oricon Daily Singles chart at number 10 and peaked at number 18 on the Oricon Weekly Singles chart, with 6,071 copies sold in its first week. The single charted for six weeks and sold a total of 10,505 copies.

"Tomorrow Waltz" was released on January 27, 2010, as the third single. "Tomorrow Waltz" peaked at number 22 on the Oricon Daily Singles chart and number 36 on the Oricon Weekly Singles chart. The single was also released with a DVD containing the music video for "Ooh wee rida", a song featured on the single "Tomorrow Waltz". "Star Light" was also released on January 27, 2010.

=== Tour ===
In June 2010, Kubota began the Timeless Fly Tour. The tour was scheduled as fifteen performances at twelve venues. The tour began at the Harmony Hall Zama, Kanagawa, on June 20. The tour was scheduled to conclude at Niigata Prefectural Civic on August 22, 2010, but three additional dates were added.

As well as singing songs from Timeless Fly, Kubota also performed songs from his previous albums and gave a medley of Michael Jackson's songs "Rock with You", along with "Right Here" and "Human Nature" which only performed by the background vocalists. Footage from the concert tour was filmed in July 2010, but was never released on DVD.

== Track listing ==
1. "Timeless Affection" (Foreplay)
2. "Keep It Rock" (featuring Wise, Tarantula from Spontania)
3. "Soul Mate"
4. "Flying Easy Loving Crazy" (featuring Misia)
5. "24/7 Nite and Day"
6. "Star Light"
7. "Is It Over?"
8. "Tomorrow Waltz"
9. "Timeless Affection (The Play)"
10. "M☆A☆G☆I☆C" (featuring Kreva)
11. "The Other Half"
12. "Boku Ja Nai"
13. "Life-Long High-Way"
14. "Nyte Flyte"
15. "Moondust" (featuring Kyōko Koizumi)

DVD track listing

1. Making of the music video "Star Light"
2. "Star Light" (music video)
3. Making of the music video "Tomorrow Waltz"
4. "Tomorrow Waltz"
5. "Timeless Affection"

== Charts ==
=== Oricon Sales Chart ===
| Release | Chart |
|---|---|
| Oricon Weekly Albums Chart | 9 |
| Oricon Yearly Albums Chart | 71 |
