= Yes Forever =

Single by Misia

from the album Just Ballade
- Released: April 30, 2008
- Recorded: 2007–2008
- Genre: R&B, pop
- Length: 4:37
- Label: BMG Japan
- Songwriter: Misia
- Producer: Sinkiroh

Misia singles chronology
"Flying Easy Loving Crazy" (2008)	"Yes Forever" (2008)	"Yakusoku no Tsubasa" (2008)

Music video
- "Yes Forever" on YouTube

"Yes Forever" is the nineteenth single by Japanese recording artist Misia. It was released on April 30, 2008 as the first single from Misia's ninth studio album Just Ballade.

== Background ==
"Yes Forever"
A 30-second sample of the beginning chorus of "Yes Forever."

The single was released as the first of a set of three releases planned for a three-month period. The first press edition comes housed in a cardboard sleeve and includes a 720mm×477mm poster of the cover artwork.

"Yes Forever" was written by Misia and composed and produced by Sinkiroh. CDJournal described the song as a "medium tempo ballad which makes ample use of Misia's crystal-clear vocals and showcases her personality with ease." It was used in commercials for Kose cosmetics Sekkisei, starring Nanako Matsushima, which were broadcast throughout Asia. The single comprises both the single and piano versions of "Yes Forever."

Despite being the original, the single version was not featured in Just Ballade; instead the piano version, produced by Tohru Shigemi, was included.

After the success that had the single of Misia, the acoustic dubstep remix version made by Noisia was not included in the single for unknown reasons, and this remix to date is still unpublished and has never been published.

== Chart performance ==
"Yes Forever" debuted on the Oricon Daily Singles chart at number 7 and peaked at number 15 on the Oricon Weekly Singles chart, with 6,761 copies sold in its first week. The single charted for five weeks and sold a total of 10,505 copies.

== Track listing ==
No.	Title	Lyrics	Music	Length
1.	"Yes Forever"	Misia	Sinkiroh	4:37
2.	"Yes Forever (Piano Version)"	Misia	Sinkiroh	4:54
3.	"Taiyō no Chizu (Gomi's Vajra Mix)" (太陽の地図 "Map of the Sun")	Misia	Gomi, Shusui	5:53
4.	"Ishin Denshin (Mega Raiders Remix)" (以心伝心 "Telepathy")	Mayumi Satō	Sakoshin	4:43
5.	"Yes Forever (Piano Version Instrumental)"	Misia	Sinkiroh	4:54
6.	"Yes Forever (Misia & Noisia Remix)" ("Unreleased acoustic track")	Misia	Noisia, Sinkiroh	3:53
Total length:				28:54

== Charts ==
Chart (2008)	Peak position
Billboard Japan Hot 100	4
Billboard Japan Hot Top Airplay	4
Oricon Daily Singles	7
Oricon Weekly Singles	15
Oricon Yearly Singles	546
SoundScan Japan Weekly Singles (Limited Edition)	14
Taiwan Five Music J-pop/K-pop Chart	19
Taiwan G-Music J-pop Chart	19

== Release history ==
Region	Date	Format	Label
Japan	April 30, 2008	CD, digital download	BMG Japan
Taiwan	May 2, 2008	CD	Sony Music Entertainment
Hong Kong	June 2, 2008	CD	Sony Music Entertainment
