= Experience: Jill Scott 826+ =

Live album by Jill Scott
- Released: November 20, 2001
- Recorded: August 25–26, 2001; Washington, D.C.
- Genre: R&B; soul; neo soul
- Length: 127:43
- Label: Hidden Beach
- Producer: 4hero; Ivan "Orthodox" Barias; Vidal Davis; Fatback Taffy; Andre Harris; Darren Henson; Jill Scott; Ted Thomas Jr.

Jill Scott chronology
Who Is Jill Scott?: Words and Sounds Vol. 1 (2000)	Experience: Jill Scott 826+ (2001)	Beautifully Human: Words and Sounds Vol. 2 (2004)

Singles from Experience: Jill Scott 826+
- 1. "He Loves Me (Lyzel in E Flat)" Released: November 21, 2001; 2. "Gimme" Released: December 11, 2001

Professional ratings
Review scores
Source	Rating
AllMusic	4/5 stars
E! Online	A−
LA Weekly	Favorable
NME	6/10
PopMatters	Favorable
Q	4/5 stars
Slant Magazine	4/5 stars
Spin	6/10
Vibe	4/5

Experience: Jill Scott 826+ is a live album by American singer Jill Scott, released on November 20, 2001, by Hidden Beach Recordings. The album was promoted by the singles "Gimme" and the live version of "He Loves Me (Lyzel in E Flat)", with videos shot for both.

The first disc contains concert recordings from her Words and Sounds Tour; the "826" in the album title refers to the August 26, 2001, concert in Washington, D.C., that comprises most of the live material. The "+" in the title refers to bonus material, including previously unreleased studio recordings, collected on the second disc.

== Track listing ==
=== Disc one (826) ===
1. "Show Intro (Alright Man, It's Time for You to Move)" – 1:33
2. "A Long Walk (Groove)" (Jill Scott, Andre Harris) – 6:18
3. "Love Rain (Suite)" (Scott, Vidal Davis) – 12:30
4. "Slowly Surely" (Scott, Darren Henson, Don Thompson, Kamaal Fareed, Malik Taylor, Ali Shaheed Muhammad, James Yancey, Towa Tei, Bebel Gilberto) – 3:50
5. "One Is the Magic # (Redux)" (Scott, Davis) – 6:19
6. "Do You Remember" (Scott, Harris) – 8:40
7. "Gettin' In the Way" (Scott, Davis) – 7:42
8. "It's Love" (Scott, Henson, Keith Pelzer) – 7:36
9. "The Way" (featuring Mike Phillips) (Scott, Harris) – 8:26
10. "Fatback Taffy" (Scott) – 2:15
11. "He Loves Me (Lyzel in E Flat) (Movements I, II & III)" (Scott, Pelzer) – 9:02

=== Disc two (+) ===
1. "Free (Prelude)" (Scott, Harris) – 1:31
2. "Gotta Get Up (Another Day)" (featuring 4hero) (Scott, Mark Clair, Brad Munn) – 4:58
3. "One Time" (Scott, Davis, Eric Roberson) – 3:55
4. "Sweet Justice" (Scott, Davis, Henson) – 5:20
5. "Thickness" (Scott) – 11:02
6. "High Post Brotha" (featuring Common) (Scott, Ivan Barias, Lonnie Lynn, Dale Warren) – 3:41
7. "Gimme" (Scott, Barias, Randy Muller) – 3:33
8. "Be Ready" (Scott, Ted Thomas Jr., Jay Chattaway) – 3:13
9. "Free (Epilogue)"/"Gotta Get Up (Another Day)" (Minnie Version featuring 4hero) – 16:18

== Charts ==
=== Weekly charts ===
Weekly chart performance for Experience: Jill Scott 826+
Chart (2001–2002)	Peak position
Dutch Albums (Album Top 100)	93
UK Albums (OCC)	122
UK R&B Albums (OCC)	18
US Billboard 200	38
US Top R&B/Hip-Hop Albums (Billboard)	7

=== Year-end charts ===
Year-end chart performance for Experience: Jill Scott 826+
Chart (2002)	Position
US Top R&B/Hip-Hop Albums (Billboard)	50

== Certifications ==
Certifications for Experience: Jill Scott 826+
Region	Certification	Certified units/sales
United States (RIAA)	Gold	500,000^{^}
^{^} Shipments figures based on certification alone.
