= Who Is Jill Scott?: Words and Sounds Vol. 1 =

Studio album by Jill Scott
- Released: July 18, 2000
- Studios: A Touch of Jazz (Philadelphia); The Studio (Philadelphia) (Note: Strings on tracks 7 and 9)
- Genres: Neo soul; jazz; R&B
- Length: 72:59
- Label: Hidden Beach
- Producers: Vidal Davis; The Grand Wizzards; Carvin Haggins; Andre Harris; Darren Henson; Richard Nichols; Keith Pelzer; James Poyser; Ted Thomas Jr.; Jeff Townes

Jill Scott chronology
Who Is Jill Scott?: Words and Sounds Vol. 1 (2000)	Experience: Jill Scott 826+ (2001)

Singles from Who Is Jill Scott?: Words and Sounds Vol. 1
- 1. "Love Rain" Released: July 18, 2000; 2. "Gettin' In the Way" Released: October 17, 2000; 3. "A Long Walk" Released: January 16, 2001; 4. "The Way" Released: June 5, 2001

Who Is Jill Scott?: Words and Sounds Vol. 1 is the debut studio album by American singer Jill Scott. It was released on July 18, 2000, by Hidden Beach Recordings. The album was nominated for Best R&B Album at the 2001 Grammy Awards, whereas "Gettin' in the Way", "A Long Walk", and "He Loves Me (Lyzel in E Flat)" were nominated for Best Female R&B Vocal Performance in 2001, 2002, and 2003, respectively. In 2010, the album was ranked number 70 on Slant Magazine's list of "The 100 Best Albums of the 2000s".

In the United States, the album peaked at number 17 on the Billboard 200 and number two on the Top R&B/Hip-Hop Albums charts, selling over 2.5 million copies.

== Background ==
Scott began her career as a spoken word artist, performing at local live poetry readings. Influenced by Gil Scott-Heron, Nikki Giovanni and Chaka Khan, she later segued into music and was discovered by Ahmir "Questlove" Thompson of The Roots, who invited her to collaborate with the band in the studio. This led to Scott receiving a co-writing credit on their song "You Got Me," which went on to win the Grammy Award for Best Rap Performance by a Duo or Group. Following this exposure, Scott collaborated with artists including Eric Benet, Will Smith, and Common. She also expanded her performing experience by touring Canada in a production of the Broadway musical Rent. Around this time, she became the first artist signed to Steve McKeever's Hidden Beach Recordings label and began work on her debut album, involving musicians such as Dre & Vidal, The Grand Wizzards, Carvin Haggins, James Poyser, and Jeff Townes.

== Composition ==
Rolling Stone writer Barry Walters summarized the album's vibe: "Mixing song with recited poetry over live beats, Scott's debut recalls the heady lyrical gifts of Billie Holiday, Marvin Gaye, Teena Marie and Nikki Giovanni, just to name a few. But this free spirit is about more than words: Jazzy, honey-dipped arrangements bypass samples in favor of real strings, woodwinds, horns and drummers who swing."

Track two, "Do You Remember," was likened to a Prince composition. Track seven, "He Loves Me (Lyzel in E Flat)," features a "jazzy" piano, a bass, and "cool" synths. Track 11, "Love Rain," is "drenched in thick beats." Track 14, "One Is the Magic #," has a "spiritual" and "Latin-flavored" sound.

== Critical reception ==
Professional ratings
Review scores
Source	Rating
AllMusic	5/5 stars
Chicago Sun-Times	4/4 stars
Entertainment Weekly	A
Los Angeles Times	3/4 stars
Muzik	5/5
Pitchfork	7.7/10
Q	4/5 stars
Rolling Stone	3.5/5 stars
Slant Magazine	4.5/5 stars
USA Today	3.5/4 stars

Who Is Jill Scott?: Words and Sounds Vol. 1 earned generally favorable reviews from music critics.

Entertainment Weekly's Jim Farber felt that the album "boasts the gutsiest voice of any neo-soul star. Though she plows the same jazzy field as Erykah Badu, Scott owns a stronger instrument and writes earthier material. Her honey molasses voice will coat all your senses." Steve Jones from USA Today called Scott "a deeply talented artist who marches to her own drummer. She tackles a variety of subjects, including love, politics and inspiration, with an earthiness, fervor and view of reality that vividly set her apart from her contemporaries. Answering the album title's question may not be simple, but what's sure is that Jill Scott is a singer worth repeated listenings." Los Angeles Times critic Soren Baker noted that "with an earthy vibe and a fresh presentation of modern soul music, this Roots collaborator subtly sizzles on her debut album. Scott’s gentle voice fluctuates between sensuous and sad as she details the satisfaction of love fulfilled and the messy heartbreak of failed relationships."

Slant Magazine's Sal Cinquemani called the album "passionately spiritual. Most of the tracks on the album avoid hip-hop clichés and sampling in favor of elevation and organic soul. With Who Is Jill Scott?, Scott almost single-handedly revives the spirit in soul music." AllMusic editor William Ruhlmann rated the album four of five stars. He felt that Producer Jeff Townes "and his team of associates from the A Touch of Jazz production company set up sympathetic musical backgrounds for Scott that support her without requiring her to fit her spoken and sung excursions into strict meter. That gives her range to pursue her interests, which include a strong sense of her north Philadelphia neighborhood and such idiosyncratic concerns as food, with many meals listed in detail." Rolling Stone critic Barry Walters wrote: This long-player smells like classic soul spirit."

== Accolades ==
The album was nominated for Best R&B Album at the 2001 Grammy Awards, whereas "Gettin' in the Way", "A Long Walk", and "He Loves Me (Lyzel in E Flat)" were nominated for Best Female R&B Vocal Performance in 2001, 2002, and 2003, respectively. In 2010, Who Is Jill Scott?: Words and Sounds Vol. 1 was ranked number 70 on Slant Magazine's list of "The 100 Best Albums of the 2000s," calling the album "the best R&B debut of the decade (and one of the best R&B albums of the last 10 years, period)."

== Chart performance ==
Who Is Jill Scott?: Words and Sounds Vol. 1 debuted at number 168 on the US Billboard 200 in the week of August 5, 2000 and eventually peaked at number 17 in March 2001. It also reached number two on Billboard's Top R&B/Hip-Hop Albums chart. The album was cerified Gold by the Recording Industry Association of America (RIAA) on October 25, 2000, and was later certified 2× Platinum in September 2004. By June 2011, it had sold 2.5 million copies in the United States.

Outside the United States, Who Is Jill Scott?: Words and Sounds Vol. 1 achieved moderate chart success across several markets. In the United Kingdom, it peaked at number 69 on the UK Albums Chart and reached number nine on the UK R&B Albums Chart. Elsewhere in Europe, it reached number 27 on Sweden's Sverigetopplistan, number 37 on Norway's VG-lista, and number 78 on the Dutch Album Top 100 chart. In Oceania, the album peaked at number 47 on the RMNZ albums chart in New Zealand.

== Track listing ==
Who Is Jill Scott?: Words and Sounds Vol. 1 track listing
No.	Title	Writer(s)	Producer(s)	Length
1.	"Jilltro"	Darren Henson; Andre Harris	Henson	1:03
2.	"Do You Remember"	Jill Scott; Harris	Harris; Keith Pelzer^{[a]}	4:43
3.	"Exclusively"	Scott; Jeff Townes	Townes	2:05
4.	"Gettin' In the Way"	Scott; Vidal Davis	Davis	3:56
5.	"A Long Walk"	Scott; Harris	Harris; Davis	4:41
6.	"I Think It's Better"	Scott; Harris	Harris	1:42
7.	"He Loves Me (Lyzel in E Flat)"	Scott; Pelzer	Pelzer	4:45
8.	"It's Love"	Scott; Pelzer; Henson	Pelzer; Henson	5:54
9.	"The Way"	Scott; Harris	Harris; Davis	4:16
10.	"Honey Molasses"	Scott; Carvin Haggins	Haggins	2:41
11.	"Love Rain"	Scott; Davis	Davis	4:12
12.	"The Roots" (Interlude)	Scott; Tariq Trotter; Ahmir Thompson; Scott Storch	The Grand Wizzards; Richard Nichols	0:57
13.	"Slowly Surely"	Scott; Henson; Don Thompson	Henson	4:35
14.	"One Is the Magic #"	Scott; Davis	Davis	3:48
15.	"Watching Me"	Scott; Ted Thomas Jr.; Rich Medina; Roy Ayers; William Allen	Thomas	3:45
16.	"Brotha"	Scott; Pelzer; Allen Toussaint	Pelzer	3:25
17.	"Show Me"	Scott; Davis	Davis	4:06
18.	"Try"	Scott; James Poyser	Poyser; Ed King^{[a]}	10:08

Japanese edition bonus track
No.	Title	Writer(s)	Producer(s)	Length
19.	"One Time" (featuring Eric Roberson)	Scott; Davis; Roberson	Davis	4:00

Notes

- ^{^[a]} signifies a co-producer
- Tracks 19–43 (and track 45 on the Japanese edition) consist of silence and last five seconds each; they are not listed on the album sleeve.
- Track 44 includes the remix of "Love Rain" featuring Mos Def as a hidden track, starting at 5:02.

Sample credits

- "The Roots (Interlude)" is an excerpt of "You Got Me" taken from the album The Roots Come Alive
- "Slowly Surely" contains a sample of "Days Gone By (Egyptology)" by Moe Koffman.
- "Watching Me" contains a sample of "No Stranger to Love" by Roy Ayers.
- "Brotha" contains a sample of "Get Out of My Life" by Joe Williams with Thad Jones and Mel Lewis.

== Charts ==
=== Weekly charts ===
Weekly chart performance for Who Is Jill Scott?: Words and Sounds Vol. 1
Chart (2000–2002)	Peak position
Dutch Albums (Album Top 100)	78
New Zealand Albums (RMNZ)	47
Norwegian Albums (VG-lista)	37
Swedish Albums (Sverigetopplistan)	27
UK Albums (Official Charts)	69
UK R&B Albums (Official Charts)	9
US Billboard 200	17
US Top R&B/Hip-Hop Albums (Billboard)	2

=== Year-end charts ===
2000 year-end chart performance for Who Is Jill Scott?: Words and Sounds Vol. 1
Chart (2000)	Position
US Top R&B/Hip-Hop Albums (Billboard)	66

2001 year-end chart performance for Who Is Jill Scott?: Words and Sounds Vol. 1
Chart (2001)	Position
Canadian R&B Albums (Nielsen SoundScan)	64
US Billboard 200	44
US Top R&B/Hip-Hop Albums (Billboard)	8

== Certifications ==
Certifications for Who Is Jill Scott?: Words and Sounds Vol. 1
Region	Certification	Certified units/sales
Canada (Music Canada)	Gold	50,000^{^}
United Kingdom (BPI)	Gold	100,000^{^}
United States (RIAA)	2× Platinum	2,500,000
^{^} Shipments figures based on certification alone.
