= Tomorrow Waltz =

Single by Toshinobu Kubota

from the album Timeless Fly
- Released: January 27, 2010
- Recorded: 2009
- Genre: R&B
- Length: 5:00
- Label: SME Records, Mastersix Foundation
- Songwriter: Toshinobu Kubota
- Producers: Toshinobu Kubota, Yoichiro Kakizaki

Toshinobu Kubota singles chronology
"Flying Easy Loving Crazy" (2008)	"Tomorrow Waltz" (2010)	"Star Light" (2010)

Music video
- "Tomorrow Waltz" on YouTube

"Tomorrow Waltz" is a song recorded by Japanese musician/singer Toshinobu Kubota. It was released on January 27, 2010, as the third single from Kubota's fifteenth studio album Timeless Fly.

== Background ==
"Tomorrow Waltz" was released on January 27, 2010, as the third single. The single was also released with a DVD containing the music video for "Ooh wee rida", a song featured on the single "Tomorrow Waltz". "Tomorrow Waltz" was written by Kubota and arranged by Yoichiro Kakizaki. The song became the theme song for NHK drama show "No Tomorrow". The song "Star Light" was also released on January 27, 2010, on the B-side of "Tomorrow Waltz".

== Chart performance ==
"Tomorrow Waltz" peaked at number 22 on the Oricon Daily Singles chart and number 36 on the Oricon Weekly Singles chart.

== Track listing ==
- CD Single
1. Tomorrow Waltz
2. Star Light
3. Ooh Wee Rida
- Limited edition DVD
1. Ooh Wee Rida (Music video)

== Charts ==
Chart (2010)	Peak position
Oricon Daily Singles	22
Oricon Weekly Singles	36
