= Star Light (Toshinobu Kubota song) =

Single by Toshinobu Kubota

from the album Timeless Fly
- Released: January 27, 2010
- Genre: R&B, pop
- Length: 4:06
- Label: SME Records
- Songwriter: Toshinobu Kubota
- Producers: Toshinobu Kubota, Yoichiro Kakizaki

Toshinobu Kubota singles chronology
"Tomorrow Waltz" (2010)	"Star Light" (2010)	"Love Rain (Koi no Ame)" (2010)

Music video
- "Star Light" on YouTube

"Star Light" is a song recorded by Japanese R&B singer Toshinobu Kubota for his fifteenth studio album, Timeless Fly.

== Overview ==
"Star Light" was released on January 27, 2010, as the B side to "Tomorrow Waltz", the fourth single from the album Timeless Fly. The song was released as a tribute to Michael Jackson, who died in June 2009.

== Track listing ==
- CD Single
1. "Tomorrow Waltz"
2. "Star Light"
3. "Ooh Wee Rida"
