= Love & Rain: Love Songs =

Compilation album by Toshinobu Kubota
- Released: November 24, 2010
- Recorded: 2009–2010
- Genre: R&B, soul
- Label: Sony Music Entertainment Japan
- Producer: Toshinobu Kubota

Toshinobu Kubota chronology
Timeless Fly (2010)	Love & Rain: Love Songs (2010)	Gold Skool (2011)

Love & Rain: Love Songs is a compilation album by Japanese singer Toshinobu Kubota. The album was released on November 24, 2010 on Sony Music Entertainment Japan and peaked at number 11 on the Oricon Weekly Albums chart. The album features the songs "Love Rain (Koi no Ame)" and "Rain", which had just been newly recorded at the time.

== Track listing ==
1. "Love Rain (Koi no Ame) (Matsuo Kiyoshi Remix)"
2. "Always Remain"
3. "Missing (2010 Version)"
4. "Amaoto"
5. "Hold Me Down" (featuring Angie Stone)
6. "Smiling In The Chaoyang"
7. "Riding to the Sight"
8. "Rain"
9. "A Love Story (Bond Street Version)"
10. "It's Time to Smile"
11. "Candy Rain"
12. "Our Christmas"
13. "Love Rain (Koi no Ame)"
14. "La La La Love Song (Midnight Piano Version)"
- Limited Edition DVD
1. "Love Rain (Koi no Ame)" (Encore from the Timeless Fly Tour 2010)
2. "Come to the Sea (Live in Concert in Tokyo)"

== Charts ==
=== Oricon Sales Chart ===
Release	Chart
Oricon Weekly Albums Chart	11
