= He Loves Me (Lyzel in E Flat) =

2001 single by Jill Scott

Single by Jill Scott

from the album Experience: Jill Scott 826+
- Released: November 21, 2001 (US radio)
- Genre: Soul; R&B
- Length: 4:45
- Label: Hidden Beach
- Songwriters: Jill Scott, Keith Pelzer
- Producers: Keith Pelzer; Jill Scott & Fat Back Taffy (Movements I, II, & III)

Jill Scott singles chronology
"The Way" (2001)	"He Loves Me (Lyzel in E Flat)" (2001)	"Golden" (2004)

"He Loves Me (Lyzel in E Flat)" is a song by American singer Jill Scott from her debut studio album, Who Is Jill Scott?: Words and Sounds Vol. 1 (2000). The song was released as a single on November 21, 2001, in support of Scott's live album Experience: Jill Scott 826+ (2001). The song was written about Scott's then spouse, Lyzel Williams. A music video edit of Scott's performance of the song in Washington, D.C., received heavy rotation on BET and VH1 cable stations. The song was nominated for Best Female R&B Vocal Performance at the 2003 Grammy Awards.

== Track listing ==
Promotional CD single
No.	Title	Length
1.	"He Loves Me" (Movements I, II, & III)	9:01
2.	"He Loves Me" (Movements I Edit)	4:13
3.	"He Loves Me" (Movements II, & III)	4:21
4.	"He Loves Me" (The Sweet Suite)	6:01
5.	"He Loves Me" (Album Version)	4:45
6.	"He Loves Me" (Album Edit)	4:08
7.	"He Loves Me" (Illegal Remix)	6:22
8.	"He Loves Me" (Illegal Remix Edit)	4:49

== Charts ==
Chart performance for "He Loves Me (Lyzel in E Flat)"
Chart (2002)	Peak position
US Bubbling Under Hot 100 (Billboard)	25
US Dance Club Songs (Billboard)	19
US Hot R&B/Hip-Hop Songs (Billboard)	46
US Adult R&B Songs (Billboard)	10
US R&B/Hip-Hop Airplay (Billboard)	43
