= Sunshine, Moonlight =

Studio album by Toshinobu Kubota
- Released: September 5, 1995
- Recorded: 1994–1995
- Genres: R&B, soul, go-go
- Length: 67:50
- Labels: Columbia (USA); Sony Music (Japan)
- Producers: Toshinobu Kubota, Kim Burse, William Burke, Camus Mare Celli, Israel Embry, Kaz Hayashida, Ralph MacDonald, Rex Rideout, William Salter, D'Wayne Wiggins, Bill Withers

Toshinobu Kubota chronology
Bumpin' Voyage (1995)	Sunshine, Moonlight (1995)	La La La Love Thang (1996)

Singles from Sunshine, Moonlight
- 1. "Funk It Up" Released: August 29, 1995; 2. "Just the Two of Us" Released: June 25, 1996

Sunshine Moonlight is the eighth studio album of Japanese singer Toshinobu Kubota, released on September 5, 1995. The album credited under the name, Toshi Kubota. This was also Kubota's first English-language album. The album's musical style ranges from 1980s–90s R&B and pop to funk elements such go-go. Synth instrumentation was not employed in recording most of the song as the album contains live instrumentation.

In 1996, Kubota released a follow-up album, La La La Love Thang, and proceed with his tour, which was titled Oyeees! Tour.

== Recording and production ==
Kubota began working on the project in 1995. After the release of his previous album "Bumpin' Voyage" in January 1995, Kubota returned the studio to begin recording a new album. Songs from "Bumpin' Voyage" were re-recorded and mastered for the "Sunshine, Moonlight" album. The songs that were re-recorded were "DJ Fonk / Funk It Up", "6 to 8 / My Love (6 to 8)", "Too Lite 2 Do / Too Light to Do", "Sunshine, Moonlight", "Kimi Wa Nani O Miteru / Oh Honey", "Not Yet! / Ain't Nobody", and "Tawawa Hit Parade". Kubota also wrote and recorded new songs for the project which include "Holding You", "Jam With Me", "Angel", "Get It Together", and "Nice & Ez".

In addition to producing, Kubota also enlisted in the production team of Kim Burse, William Burke, Camus Mare Celli, Israel Embry, Kaz Hayashida, Ralph MacDonald, Rex Rideout, William Salter, D'Wayne Wiggins, and Bill Withers. All of the songs were written or co-written by Kubota except the song "Just the Two of Us".

== Release and promotion ==
=== Singles ===
The album's lead single "Funk It Up" was released in the United States in August 1995. A music video was shot for the single. On October 21, 1995, Kubota released a maxi-single EP "Funk It Up / Nice & EZ". The singles charted at number ninety-one on the Oricon Singles chart.

In June 1996, the second single "Just the Two of Us", a duet with Caron Wheeler, was also released in the United States. Kubota and Wheeler shot a music video for their rendition of the song. The single charted at number thirty on the Oricon Singles chart.

=== Tours ===
In 1996, Kubota began the Oyeees! Tour. The tour was to promote the albums "Bumpin' Voyage", "Sunshine, Moonlight", and "La La La Love Thang". This was Kubota's first nationwide tour, which lasted for the remainder of 1996. During his performance at Yoyogi Daiichi Taiikukan in 1996, the show was filmed and released on VHS and DVD on March 1, 1997.

== Chart performance ==
The album peaked number one on the Oricon Albums chart and sold over a half of million units.

== Track listing ==
1. "Funk It Up"
2. "Just the Two of Us" (featuring Caron Wheeler)
3. "Too Light to Do"
4. "Holding You"
5. "Jam With Me"
6. "Angel"
7. "Get It Together"
8. "Nice & EZ"
9. "My Love (6 to 8)"
10. "Oh Honey"
11. "Sunshine, Moonlight"
12. "PaLaLeYa"
13. "Ain't Nobody"
14. "Tawawa Hit Parade"

== Personnel ==
- Tawatha Agee: Vocals (Background)
- Alex Alexander: Drums, Performer
- Larry Alexander: Engineer
- Louis Alfred III: Engineer
- Ben Arrindell: Assistant Engineer
- Herb Besson: Performer, Primary Artist, Trombone
- Chris Botti: Guest Artist, Performer, Primary Artist, Trumpet
- Randy Bowland: Guitar, Performer, Primary Artist
- Michael Brauer: Mixing
- David Bright: Performer, Primary Artist, Vocoder
- Gerry Brown: Mixing
- Mark Burdett: Art Direction, Design
- William Burke: Keyboards, Primary Artist, Producer, Programming
- Kim Burse: Composer, MC, Primary Artist, Vocals (Background)
- Mike Campbell: Guest Artist, Guitar, Performer, Primary Artist
- Jean Carbain: Design Assistant
- Joi Cardwell: Guest Artist, Performer, Primary Artist, Vocals (Background)
- Camus Mare Celli: Composer, Keyboards, Performer, Primary Artist, Producer, Programming
- Gordon Chambers: Composer, Performer, Primary Artist, Vocals (Background)
- Christian: Performer, Primary Artist
- Robin Clark: Vocals (Background)
- Eric Cody: Primary Artist
- Martin Czembor: Assistant Engineer
- Tim Donovan: Assistant Engineer
- Israel Embry: Keyboards, Performer, Primary Artist, Producer, Programming
- Mike Fisher: Assistant Engineer
- Lolly Grodner: Engineer
- Mick Guzauski: Mixing
- Omar Hakim: Drums, Guest Artist, Performer, Primary Artist
- Andricka Hall: Performer, Primary Artist, Vocals (Background)
- Kaz Hayashida: Associate Producer
- Hiroshi Inagaki: Producer
- John James: Performer, Primary Artist, Vocals (Background)
- Bashiri Johnson: Percussion, Performer, Primary Artist
- Steve Kroon: Percussion, Performer, Primary Artist
- Toshi Kubota: Composer, Performer, Primary Artist, Producer, Vocals (Background)
- Mark Ledford: Performer, Primary Artist, Trumpet
- Ralph MacDonald: Composer
- Andy Marvel: Keyboards, Performer, Primary Artist, Producer, Programming
- Tony Maserati: Mixing
- Steve McLoughlin: Engineer
- Vladimir Meller: Assistant Engineer
- Jeff Mironov: Performer, Primary Artist, Sitar (Electric)
- Dave O'Donnell: Engineer
- Leonard Pickett: Performer, Primary Artist, Saxophone
- Rex Rideout: Keyboards, Performer, Primary Artist, Producer, Programming
- Nile Rodgers: Guest Artist, Guitar, Performer, Primary Artist
- William Salter: Composer
- John Seymour: Assistant Engineer
- Terry T.: Performer, Primary Artist, Synthesizer Bass
- Chris Theis: Assistant Engineer
- Thorn: Performer, Primary Artist
- Fonzi Thornton: Vocals (Background)
- Audrey Wheeler: Guest Artist, Performer, Primary Artist, Vocals (Background)
- Caron Wheeler: Guest Artist, Performer, Primary Artist
- D'Wayne Wiggins: Bass, Composer, Guest Artist, Guitar, Keyboards, Performer, Primary Artist, Producer, Programming, Vocals (Background)
- Bill Withers: Composer

== Charts ==
Chart performance for Sunshine, Moonlight
Chart (1995)	Peak position
Japanese Albums (Oricon)	1
