= The Baddest: Hit Parade =

Compilation album by Toshinobu Kubota
- Released: November 23, 2011
- Genre: R&B, soul, go-go, hip hop, pop, dance
- Length: 205:31
- Label: Sony Music Entertainment Japan

Toshinobu Kubota chronology
Gold Skool (2011)	The Baddest: Hit Parade (2011)

The Baddest: Hit Parade is a compilation released by Japanese singer Toshinobu Kubota. This album was released in Japan at the end of November 2011 to commemorate the twenty-fifth anniversary of Kubota's music. The album charted at number 2 on the Oricon Weekly Albums chart and remained on the charts for a total of 38 weeks. The album became certified platinum, selling over 351,049+ units in Japan.

== Track listing ==
- CD 1
1. Tawawa Hit Parade (Funkylude)
2. Ryuusei no Saddle
3. Kitakaze to Taiyou
4. Missing
5. Time (Shower ni Utarete)
6. Cry On Your Smile
7. Tawawa Hit Parade
8. Eien no Tsubasa
9. Love Reborn
10. Indigo Waltz
11. Tawawa Hit Parade (Marvinlude)
12. Dance If You Want It
13. Give You My Love
14. Niji no Grand Slam
15. Amaoto
16. Yoru ni Dakarete (A Night in Afro Blue)
17. Yume with You
- CD 2 track list
1. Tawawa Hit Parade (THE BADDESTlude)
2. La La La Love Song
3. Sunshine, Moonlight
4. Cymbals
5. The Sound of Carnival
6. Ahhhhh!
7. Messengers' Rhyme (Rakushow!, It's your Show!)
8. Kimi ha Nani wo Miteru
9. Tawawa Hit Parade (SlowJamlude)
10. Soul Bangin'
11. Candy Rain
12. Kimi no Soba ni
13. Club Happiness
14. Tomorrow Waltz
15. Love Rain (Koi no Ame)
16. Koe ni Dekinai (Voice & Tears Version)
- DVD track list

Note that these are music videos.

1. Club Happiness
2. Soul Bangin'
3. Messengers' Rhyme (Rakushow, It's Your Show!)
4. Love Rain (Koi no Ame)
5. Ahhhhh!
6. Ryuusei no Saddle
7. Dance If You Want It
8. La La La Love Song
9. Yoru ni dakarete (A Night in Afro Blue)
10. Kimi no Soba ni
11. Cymbals
12. Missing
13. Koe ni Dekinai

== Charts ==
Chart	Peak position
Oricon Weekly Albums Chart	2
Oricon Yearly Albums Chart	27

- Total reported sales: 351,049
- Total sales in 2011: 224,992 (#27 album of the year)
- Total sales in 2012: 126,057
