= Open Computer Network =

OCN (オーシーエヌ), or Open Computer Network(オープン・コンピュータ・ネットワーク:Ōpun Konpyūta nettowāku), is the largest Japanese Internet service provider, with over 7 million subscribers. It is owned by NTT Communications Corp, one of the largest telecommunication companies in the world. It offers dial-up and ISDN, DSL up to 50 Mb/s and fiber up to 200 Mbit/s download and 100 Mb/s upload.

As a result of regulations intended to promote competition, OCN themselves offer only internet service (routing); the physical line can be offered by NTT (the parent corporation), or by another company. Speeds up to 1 Gb/s are offered in Western Japan, while in East Japan only 200 Mb/s is officially offered for residential use, even though the underlying fiber infrastructure is capable of 1 Gb/s.

OCN also offers an MVNO mobile broadband service called "OCN Mobile One", based on NTT Docomo's LTE infrastructure. Initially it started out as a data-only service, but more recently OCN Mobile One also offers an onseikake SIM card (音声対応SIMカード) that provides full service (data, SMS and voice) without requiring any calling app.

== See also ==
- Verio
