= Eighth World =

Studio album by Misia
- Released: January 9, 2008
- Recorded: 2007
- Genre: R&B, pop, dance-pop, lounge
- Length: 74:12
- Label: BMG Japan
- Producer: Misia

Misia chronology
Ascension (2007)	Eighth World (2008)	Decimo X Anniversario de Misia: The Tour of Misia 2008 Eighth World + The Best DJ Remixes (2008)

Singles from Eighth World
- 1. "Any Love" Released: July 4, 2007; 2. "Royal Chocolate Flush" Released: December 5, 2007

Professional ratings
Review scores
Source	Rating
AllMusic	3/5 stars

Eighth World (stylized as EIGHth WØRlD) is Misia's eighth studio album and her first since signing back with BMG Japan, released on January 9, 2008. It includes the singles "Any Love" and "Royal Chocolate Flush" as well as the J-Wave image song for Winter Campaign Holy December, Be in Love with J-Wave and "To Be in Love", the theme song to the Japanese release of the movie Bridge to Terabithia. The first pressing of the album was in a sleeve case packaging.

The album is certified gold for shipment of 100,000 copies.

== Title ==
The title, Eighth World, was chosen because of the coincidence of the year of release and the number of the album. Moreover, with the Kanji for eight {八, hachi), resembling a folded fan spreading out, and the symbol for infinity, ∞, being similar to the number 8 turned on its side, the message conveyed in the title is that "an infinite amount of happiness is spreading out in the eighth world of Misia".

== Information ==
With her previous album, Ascension, focusing on the vast theme of "life" and "birth", Misia began production of Eighth World with the idea of incorporating this element in a more tangible way. The album has a more personal theme, with lyrics about relationships and the many scenarios she encountered in her homeland as well as in Kenya, where she visited the Kibera slum in Nairobi. In an interview with MSN Music, she explained, "Last spring, I visited Kenya and the reality of their conditions I saw in the slums was harsher than I had imagined. It made me think over a lot of things. It made me want to sing about "real" issues and with that in mind, one of the first songs I wrote right after was "Any Love"."

"Taiyō no Malaika" was also written during her stay in Africa. A performance of the song was captured in a documentary of her visit. She explained the crowd's reaction, saying, "The words are in Japanese, so naturally, I didn't think they would understand. However, as I sang, I saw the mothers crying as they listened. That's when I realized firsthand that music has no borders and transcends language." The song "Ishin Denshin", which was written by the essayist Mayumi Satō at Misia's request, speaks of this realization.

== Track listing ==
All lyrics are written by Misia, except "Ishin Denshin", which is written by Mayumi Satō

No.	Title	Music	Length
1.	"Ishin Denshin" (以心伝心)	Sakoshin	4:45
2.	"Any Love"	Sinkiroh	4:52
3.	"Royal Chocolate Flush"	Sakoshin	3:53
4.	"November: Interlude"	Sinkiroh	0:57
5.	"Missing Autumn"	Sinkiroh	4:59
6.	"To Be in Love"	Joi	6:17
7.	"Hadashi no Kisetsu" (裸足の季節, "Barefoot Season")	Jun Sasaki	5:36
8.	"Chandelier"	Joi	4:26
9.	"Hybrid Breaks: Interlude"	Sakoshin	1:02
10.	"Dance Dance"	Sakoshin	5:31
11.	"Taiyō no Chizu" (太陽の地図, "Map of the Sun")	Gomi, Shusui	4:58
12.	"Soba ni Ite..." (そばにいて..., "Stay by My Side")	Sinkiroh	5:01
13.	"Kimi wa Sōgen ni Nekoronde" (君は草原に寝ころんで, "You Lay Down on the Grasslands")	Joi	4:40
14.	"Taiyō no Malaika" (太陽のマライカ, "Angel of the Sun")	Misia	4:47

== Charts ==
=== Oricon sales chart ===
Release	Chart	Peak position	Debut sales	Total sales	Chart run
January 9, 2008	Oricon Daily Albums Chart	1		131,635	11 weeks
January 9, 2008	Oricon Weekly Albums Chart	3	70,916	131,635	11 weeks
January 9, 2008	Oricon Monthly Albums Chart	12		131,635	11 weeks
January 9, 2008	Oricon Yearly Albums Chart	85		131,635	11 weeks

=== Physical sales charts ===
Chart	Peak position
Oricon Daily Albums Chart	1
Oricon Weekly Albums Chart	3
Oricon Monthly Albums Chart	12
Oricon Yearly Albums Chart	85
Billboard Japan TOP Albums	3
G-Music J-pop Chart (Taiwan)	4
Five Music J-pop/K-pop Chart (Taiwan)	5
Soundscan Albums Chart (CD-Only)	2
