= Funk It Up =

Single by Toshi Kubota

from the album Sunshine, Moonlight
- Released: August 29, 1995 (Maxi single); October 21, 1995 (Maxi single EP)
- Recorded: 1994
- Genre: R&B
- Length: 4:55
- Label: Columbia
- Songwriter(s): Toshinobu Kubota
- Producer(s): Toshinobu Kubota, Kim Burse, Camus Mare Celli

Toshi Kubota singles chronology
"Niji no Grand Slam" (1995)	"Funk It Up" (1995)	"La La La Love Song" (1996)

Alternative cover
- Maxi single EP

Music video
- "Funk It Up" on YouTube

"Funk It Up" is a song recorded by Japanese R&B singer Toshinobu Kubota for his eighth studio album, Sunshine, Moonlight (1995). The song was written by Kubota and produced by Kubota, Kim Burse, Camus Mare Celli.

== Background ==
Kubota and his band in the music video (Funk It Up).

Originally, the song was recorded in Japanese language under the name of "D.J. Fonk", which on his seventh album "Bumpin' Voyage". In 1995, Kubota recorded the song in English language for first English-language album "Sunshine, Moonlight. It also features background vocals from Alex Alexander, Kim Burse, Camus Mare Celli, Eric Cody, Nile Rodgers, and Thorn.

The song became Kubota's first international single release outside Japan. In October 1995, the maxi single EP charted at number 91 on the Oricon Weekly Singles chart. The single dropped the chart in the same week of its debut.

=== Music video ===
In 1995, Kubota shot a music video for the song. The concept of the music video features Kubota in a room, along with his band, singing the song. He also seen standing between two walls and dancing to the music. Another scene takes place with Kubota in a room filled only with white balloons. There are also scenes of girl with an afro, a couple standing in front of grocery store shelf, and several other people making different statements. Several cartoon clips, such a fire-breathing dragon and a panda with a ray gun, are also used in music video. It is also noted that several of Kubota's scenes are contrasted in black-and-white.

== Track listing ==
- Maxi single
1. Funk It Up (Morales Club of Funk Mix)
2. Funk It Up (Dub of Funky Mix)
3. Funk It Up (Funky & Lifted Mix)
4. Funk It Up (All Star Street Funk Mix)
5. Funk It Up (All Star Street Funk Mix Acappella)
- Maxi single EP
1. Funk It Up (LP Funk Version)
2. Funk It Up (Morales Club of Funk Mix)
3. Funk It Up (All Star Street Funk Mix)
4. Nice & EZ

== Chart performance ==
Chart (1996)	Peak position
Japan Oricon Weekly Singles Chart	91
