= Royal Chocolate Flush =

Single by Misia

from the album Eighth World
- Released: December 5, 2007
- Recorded: 2007
- Genre: R&B, dance-pop
- Length: 3:54
- Label: BMG Japan
- Songwriters: Misia, Sakoshin, Shusui
- Producer: Sakoshin

Misia singles chronology
"Any Love" (2007)	"Royal Chocolate Flush" (2007)	"Flying Easy Loving Crazy" (2008)

Music video
- "Royal Chocolate Flush" on YouTube

"Royal Chocolate Flush" is the eighteenth single by Japanese recording artist Misia. It was released on December 5, 2007, as the second single from Misia's eighth studio album Eighth World.

== Background ==
"Royal Chocolate Flush"
A 25-second sample of the second chorus of "Royal Chocolate Flush."

The single was released simultaneously with the Hoshizora no Live IV Classics tour DVD. It is Misia's first EP-length single, which consists of three other tracks. The A-side, "Royal Chocolate Flush," was written by Misia, composed by Sakoshin and Shusui, and produced by Sakoshin. In an interview with OCN's Talking Japan, Misia explained the theme of the lyrics, "The song is for all the girls who have ever had to choose between either love or work. It's about tossing away the negativity and putting in double the effort in order to have both."

The main B-side of the single, "Taiyō no Chizu," was also written by Misia, composed by Gomi and Shusui, and produced by Gomi. It served as theme song for the Fuji TV morning show Mezamashi TV, from October 2007 to March 2008. The single also includes "Chandelier," which was first performed during the Hoshizora no Live IV Classics tour, and "Kiss and Hug," the theme song for the J-Wave radio show of the same name.

== Chart performance ==
"Royal Chocolate Flush" debuted on the Oricon Daily Singles chart at number 4 and peaked at number 10 on the Oricon Weekly Singles chart, with 11,670 copies sold in its first week. The single charted for seven weeks and sold a total of 19,576 copies.

== Track listing ==
No.	Title	Lyrics	Music	Length
1.	"Royal Chocolate Flush"	Misia	Sakoshin, Shusui	3:54
2.	"Taiyō no Chizu" (太陽の地図 "Map of the Sun")	Misia	Gomi, Shusui	5:28
3.	"Chandelier"	Misia	Joi	4:27
4.	"Kiss and Hug"	Shuntarō Tanikawa	Misia	2:32
Total length:				16:21

== Charts ==
Chart (2007–08)	Peak position
Billboard Japan Hot 100	56
Oricon Daily Singles	4
Oricon Weekly Singles	10
SoundScan Japan Weekly Singles	6

== Release history ==
Region	Date	Format	Label
Japan	December 5, 2007	CD, digital download	BMG Japan
Taiwan	December 14, 2007	CD	Sony Music Entertainment Taiwan
