= Jun Sasaki =

- Also known as: Yajimax
- Born: Jun Sasaki 佐々木 潤 July 7, 1966 (age 59)
- Origin: Sendai, Miyagi, Japan
- Genres: Folk rock, pop, soul, dance
- Occupations: Singer-songwriter, record producer, disc jockey, remixer, photographer, model
- Years active: 1987–present
- Website: Official website

Jun Sasaki (佐々木 潤, Sasaki Jun; born July 7, 1966) is a Japanese singer-songwriter and record producer. He is best known for his work as a record producer for acts including Misia, Chara, and Yuki Koyanagi. Sasaki also works as a photographer under the alias of Yajimax. In 2005, Sasaki married musician and actress Kaori Hifumi.
