= Any Love (Misia song) =

Single by Misia

from the album Eighth World
- B-side: "Soba ni Ite..."
- Released: July 4, 2007
- Recorded: 2007
- Genre: R&B, pop
- Length: 5:00
- Label: BMG Japan
- Songwriters: Misia, Sinkiroh
- Producer: Sinkiroh

Misia singles chronology
"Sea of Dreams: Tokyo DisneySea 5th Anniversary Theme Song" (2006)	"Any Love" (2007)	"Royal Chocolate Flush" (2007)

"Any Love" is the seventeenth single by Japanese recording artist Misia. It was released on July 4, 2007 as the first single from Misia's eighth studio album Eighth World.

== Background ==
"Any Love" is Misia's first release since switching record labels, from Avex back to BMG Japan. The single was released simultaneously with The Tour of Misia 2007 Ascension concert DVD and Blu-ray. The first press edition of the single comes with a bonus DVD, which includes the music video for "Any Love" and a special film documenting Misia's stay in Nairobi, Kenya, where the video and artwork for the single cover were shot.

== Composition ==
The A-side, "Any Love," was written by Misia, while the composition and production were handled by Sinkiroh. The song was inspired by Misia's visit to the Kibera slum in Nairobi, Kenya. Coming from Ascension, which dealt with the broad themes of life and its origins, Misia wanted to write about something more familiar and close to home, namely love or everyday life. After writing lyrics that seemed too perfect and lacking a sense of reality, Misia felt at a loss and decided to take a trip to Africa, a place she had long wanted to visit. The culture and people left a deep impression on Misia which led her to rewrite "Any Love."

In an interview with music site Vibe, she commented, "(the song) was done before I left for Africa, but when I came back I realized there was more that I wanted to say, so I rewrote the lyrics and recorded it over again. In today's society, it's hard to discern between "reality" and "truth" and I wanted this song to reflect what I think makes them different."

"Any Love"
A 29-second sample of the first chorus of "Any Love."

When asked about the importance of the line "Honki de aishiteku" (本気で愛してく; "I'll love you for real"), which is repeated throughout the choruses, Misia elaborated:

When I came back to Tokyo, I was taken aback by the contrast between the world I had been living in and the world I had just visited. I didn't know what was real anymore. But as I got back to my friends and family and music, I realized that love is what makes it all real. It's what's needed to distinguish "reality" from "truth." The message of the song is that when facing love, you have to take it seriously.

The B-side, "Soba ni Ite...," was also written by Misia and composed and produced by Sinkiroh. When asked about the song's message, Misia explained:

("Soba ni Ite...") speaks of a message I've wanted to express for a few years now. I think it's great that, with the Internet, cell phones, and e-mail, there are now a variety of ways for us to communicate with each other, but they've somewhat become substitutes for direct interactions. The reason people feel the need to be close to each other is because, as humans, we connect with more than just our eyes or our ears, but with our entire body. We can never be entirely sastified without meeting face-to-face.

"Soba ni Ite..." was used in commercials for Kose cosmetics Sekkisei, starring Nanako Matsushima.

== Chart performance ==
"Any Love" debuted on the Oricon Daily Singles chart at number 8 on July 3, 2007 and climbed to number 7 the following day. It peaked at number 8 on the Oricon Weekly Singles chart, with 13,811 copies sold in its first week. "Any Love" is Misia's first top ten single in three years, since "Namae no Nai Sora o Miagete." It charted for five weeks and sold a total of 22,876 copies.

== Track listing ==
All lyrics are written by Misia; all music is composed by Sinkiroh.

No.	Title	Arranger(s)	Length
1.	"Any Love"	Sinkiroh	5:00
2.	"Soba ni Ite..." (そばにいて... "Stay by My Side")	Tohru Shigemi	4:58
Total length:			9:58

== Charts ==
Chart (2007)	Peak position
Oricon Daily Singles	7
Oricon Weekly Singles	8
SoundScan Japan Weekly Singles (Limited Edition)	11
Taiwan Five Music J-pop/K-pop Chart	9

== Release history ==
Region	Date	Format	Label
Japan	July 4, 2007	CD+DVD, digital download	BMG Japan
Taiwan	July 6, 2007	CD	Sony Music Entertainment
Hong Kong	July 17, 2007	CD+DVD	Sony Music Entertainment
