= La La La Love Song =

Single by Toshinobu Kubota featuring Naomi Campbell

from the album La La La Love Thang
- Released: May 13, 1996
- Genre: Pop, R&B
- Length: 4:47
- Label: Sony Music Entertainment Japan
- Songwriter: Toshinobu Kubota
- Producer: Yoichiro Kakizaki

Toshinobu Kubota featuring Naomi Campbell singles chronology
"Funk It Up" (1995)	"La La La Love Song" (1996)	"Just the Two of Us" (1996)

Music video
- "La La La Love Song" on YouTube

"La La La Love Song" is a song recorded by Japanese R&B singer Toshinobu Kubota for his ninth studio album, La La La Love Thang (1996). The song was written by Kubota and produced by Yoichiro Kakizaki.

== Background ==
The song was credited under the name Toshinobu Kubota with Naomi Campbell. Naomi Campbell met Kubota in New York. The two would eventually work together in a collaboration.

The song became the theme song for the Fuji TV drama "Long Vacation". In September 1996, the song achieved million purchases and also became Kubota's first number one single on the Oricon singles chart. At week 6, the song achieved the number one spot on the Oricon Weekly Singles chart and remained on the charts for ten weeks. On December 10, 2011, the song charted at number 73 on Billboard Japan's Hot 100 chart. It is noted that "La La La Love Song" remains Kubota's signature song.

=== Music video ===
In 1996, Kubota shot a music video for the song. The video setting takes place in an empty club whereas Kubota and his band are playing and a waitress is cleaning up. Different video scenes from TV drama "Long Vacation" are used in the music video. The music video was contrasted to black and white, with the exception of video scenes from Long Vacation. It also noted that Naomi Campbell makes no physical appearance in the video.

== Track listing ==
1. La La La Love Song (featuring Naomi Campbell)
2. What's The Wonder?
3. La La La Love Song (Instrumental)

== Cover versions ==
- 2002: Winnie Hsin recorded a Chinese version of the song, named "Long Vacation" (長假) in the album "Oh Lovers" (戀人啊).
- 2004: BoA + SOUL'd OUT recorded the song for the Toshinobu Kubota tribute album "Soul Tree: A Musical Tribute to Toshinobu Kubota". The song was also included her greatest hits album Best of Soul.
- 2004: Laura Fiji~i recorded the song for the "20 Jazz Greatest Hits Song Book" cover album in English.
- 2005: Park Yong-Ha recorded the song for his extended play "Sometime".
- 2007: Karen Gong performed a Malaysian version of the song, titled "Na Na Na Nada Cinta". The song was released on their album "Mulakan".
- 2009: Daichi Miura performed the song in concert, which appears on his concert DVD "DAICHI MIURA LIVE 2009 -Encore of Our Love-".
- 2010: Nokko covered the song, which featured KG, for her album, Kiss.
- 2011: Atsushi and Nesmith from Exile recorded the song for the limited edition "Exile Cover" album bundled with "Negai no Tou". This version was later included in their album "Exile Japan".
- 2012: Beni recorded the song for her cover album "Covers".
- 2012: Stevie Hoang recorded an English version of the song. The song was released on his album "All For You"
- 2013: Ayaka recorded the song for her cover album "遊音俱楽部〜1st grade〜".
- 2014: Unchain recorded the song for their cover album "Love & Groove Delivery Vol.2".
- 2018: K-pop singer and former 15& member Yerin Baek recorded the song in Japanese, which can be heard on her SoundCloud page.
- 2022: K-pop singer and NCT member Doyoung recorded the song in Japanese, which can be heard on his Instagram @do0_nct.
- 2024: Korean singer Gongwon recorded the song for the webtoon Operation: True Love

== Charts and certifications ==
Release	Chart	Peak Position	Sales Total	Chart Run
May 13, 1996	Japan Oricon Weekly Singles Chart	1	2,000,000	28
May 13, 1996	Japan Oricon Monthly Singles Chart	1	2,000,000	28
May 13, 1996	Japan Oricon Yearly Singles Chart	3	2,000,000	28
December 10, 2011	Japan Billboard Hot 100	73	1	

=== Certifications ===
Region (provider)	Certifications
Japan (RIAJ)	2x Million

== See also ==
List of best-selling singles in 1996 (Japan)
