= Amazon =

Amazon most often refers to:

- Amazon (company), an American multinational technology and retail company
- Amazon rainforest, a rainforest covering most of the Amazon basin
- Amazon River, in South America
- Amazons, a tribe of female warriors in Greek mythology

Amazon or Amazone may also refer to:

== Arts and entertainment ==
=== Fictional characters ===
- Amazon (Amalgam Comics)
- Amazon, an alias of the Marvel supervillain Man-Killer
- Amazons (DC Comics), a group of superhuman characters
- The Amazon, a Diablo II character
- The Amazon, a Pro Wrestling character
- Amazon (Dragon's Crown), from the Dragon's Crown game
- Kamen Rider Amazon, title character in the fourth installment of the Kamen Rider series

=== Film and television ===
- The Amazons (1917 film), an American silent tragedy film
- The Amazon (film), a 1921 German silent film
- War Goddess, also known as The Amazons, a 1973 Italian adventure fantasy drama
- Amazons (1984 film), an American thriller
- Amazons (1986 film), an Argentine adventure fantasy
- Amazon (1990 film), a 1990 drama
- Amazon (1997 film), a short documentary
- Amazon (1999 TV series), a Canadian drama
- Amazon (2000 film), a 2000 French film
- Amazon (2008 TV series), a British documentary series
- Kamen Rider Amazons, a 2016 Japanese web drama

=== Gaming ===
- Amazon (chess), a fairy chess piece
- Amazons (solitaire), a card game
- Amazon (video game), a 1984 interactive fiction graphic adventure game
- Amazon: Guardians of Eden, a 1992 video game
- Game of the Amazons, a board game

=== Literature ===
- Amazons!, a 1979 fantasy anthology edited by Jessica Amanda Salmonson
- Amazons (novel), 1980, co-written by Don DeLillo, published under the pseudonym Cleo Birdwell
- Swallows and Amazons series, twelve children's novels by Arthur Ransome
- The Amazon (novella), by Nikolai Leskov
- The Amazons (play), by Arthur Wing Pinero

=== Music ===
- The Amazons (band), a British indie band from Reading, Berkshire
  - The Amazons (album)
- Amazons (Japanese group), a female group formed in 1985

== Businesses and organizations ==
- Amazon Bookstore Cooperative, a feminist bookstore (1970–2012)
- Amazonen-Werke, a German agricultural machinery manufacturer (founded 1883)
- Café Amazon, Thai coffee chain
- Takembeng, or les Amazones des SDF, a 1990s women's social movement in Cameroon

== Military units ==
- Amazonian Guard, or "the Amazons", a bodyguard unit of Muammar Gaddafi
- Amazons Company, a Greek ceremonial female battalion
- Dahomey Amazons, a Fon regiment

== People ==
- Amazon Eve (born 1979), American model, fitness trainer, and actress
- Lesa Lewis (born 1967), American professional bodybuilder nicknamed "Amazon"

== Places ==
- Amazon Basin (sedimentary basin), at the middle and lower course of the river
- Amazon basin, the part of South America drained by the river and its tributaries
- Amazon Creek, a stream in Oregon, U.S.
- Amazon Delta, a vast river delta formed by the Amazon and Tocantins Rivers in northern South America
- Amazon Reef, at the mouth of the Amazon basin
- 1042 Amazone, an asteroid

== Sports ==
- COD United Amazons F.C., a women's association football club in Lagos State, Nigeria
- Los Angeles Amazons, a women's semi-professional American football team (2002–2012)
- Nasarawa Amazons F.C., a women's association football club in Nasarawa State, Nigeria
- Vancouver Amazons, a Canadian women's ice hockey team of the 1920s

== Transportation ==
=== Land vehicles ===
- Amazon (automobile), a 1920s British cyclecar
- Amazon, a GWR 3031 Class locomotive operating 1892–1908
- Amazon, a GWR Iron Duke Class locomotive operating 1851–1877
- Volvo Amazon, a 1956–1970 mid-size car

=== Ships ===
- Amazon (1780 ship), launched in France in 1775 under another name
- Amazon (brigitane), a Canadian brigantine launched 1861, later more famously named Mary Celeste
- Amazon (yacht), a British screw schooner built 1885
- Amazon-class frigate, four classes of frigate of the British Royal Navy
- Amazon-class sloop, of the British Royal Navy
- French submarine Amazone (1916), an Armide-class diesel-electric attack submarine
- HMS Amazon, nine ships of the Royal Navy
- RMS Amazon, two ships of the Royal Mail Steam Packet Company
- SMS Amazone (1843), a 3-masted sail corvette of the Prussian Navy
- SMS Amazone, a 1900 2,700 ton Gazelle-class light cruiser
- USS Amazon (1861), a US Navy bark

== Other uses ==
- Amazon (color), a variant of jungle green
- .amazon, an Amazon.com-operated internet top-level domain

== See also ==
- Amason (disambiguation)
- Amazonas (disambiguation)
- Amazonia (disambiguation)
- Amazonian (disambiguation)
- Amyzon (disambiguation)
- Amazonka, a 2008 album by Ruslana
- Amazon parrot, a bird genus
- Amazonis Planitia, on Mars
- Amazonsaurus, a dinosaur genus
