= Manuel Gava =

German politician (born 1991)

Member of the Bundestag; for Stadt Osnabrück
- In office 26 October 2021 – 25 March 2025
- Preceded by: Mathias Middelberg
- Succeeded by: Mathias Middelberg

Personal details
- Born: 20 February 1991 (age 35) Pieve di Cadore, Italy
- Party: Social Democratic

Manuel Gava (born 20 February 1991) is a German-Italian politician of the Social Democratic Party (SPD) who was a member of the Bundestag for Osnabrück City from 2021 to 2025.

== Early life and education ==
Gava was born in the Dolomite region of Pieve di Cadore in Italy. After moving to Germany, he grew up in Taunusstein in Hesse. After completing secondary school at the IGS Aar, he initially worked in his father's ice cream parlour. In 2010, he moved to a company for ice cream supplies. In 2012, he came to Osnabrück. Since then, he has been working for a wholesale company that supplies bakeries, confectioners, catering businesses and ice cream cafés. Initially, Gava worked there in field sales and has been sales manager since 2019. According to his own information, Manuel Gava is single.

== Political career ==
=== Early beginnings ===
Gava joined the SPD in 2016 and a year later became deputy chairman of the Juso AG Osnabrück city. In 2018, he took over the chairmanship and kept it until March 2019. Since February 2018, he has been the deputy chairman of the local association Altstadt-Westerberg-Innenstadt of the Osnabrück SPD.

Since March 2019, Gava has been chairman of the Osnabrück Stadt SPD sub-district.

In August 2020, the subdistrict nominated him as a direct candidate for constituency 39 in the 2021 German federal election.

The relevant constituency delegates' conference, which included delegates from the district municipalities of Belm, Georgsmarienhütte, Hagen, Osnabrück, Hasbergen and Wallenhorst, then elected him as one of the challengers to Mathias Middelberg (CDU), who was directly elected in 2017. On 26 September 2021, he took the direct mandate from the latter in the Bundestag election. Gava came to 30.3 percent, Middelberg to 29.2 percent of the first votes. Gava thus represents the Osnabrück Stadt.

=== Member of the German Parliament (2021–2025) ===
In parliament, Gava has been serving on the Committee on Labour and Social Affairs and the Committee on Economic Cooperation and Development.

In addition to his committee assignments, Gava is part of the German-Italian Parliamentary Friendship Group, the German-Brazilian Parliamentary Friendship Group and the German Parliamentary Friendship Group for Relations with the Andean States.

Within his parliamentary group, Gave is part of a working group on migration and integration and chairs a discussion group on Latin America and the Caribbean.

In December 2024, Gava admitted to frequent use of cocaine and announced that he would not stand in the 2025 federal elections but instead resign by the end of the parliamentary term.

== Other activities ==
- German United Services Trade Union (ver.di), Member
- VfL Osnabrück, Member
- AWO
- Citizens' association Neustadt e.V.
- Citizens' association Schinkel von 1912 e.V.
- German-Italian Society Osnabrück e.V.
- Erich Maria Remarque Society e.V.
- Exile e.V.
- Fanscene Osnabrück e.V.
- Felix Nussbaum Society e.V.
- Gay in May e.V.
- Managerkreis of the Friedrich Ebert Foundation
