= Stadt Osnabrück =

Federal electoral district of Germany

39 Stadt Osnabrück
- Electoral district for the Bundestag
- Stadt Osnabrück in 2025
- State: Lower Saxony
- Population: 258,300 (2019)
- Electorate: 195,467 (2021)
- Major settlements: Osnabrück
- Area: 325.3 km^{2}

Current electoral district
- Created: 1949
- Party: CDU
- Member: Mathias Middelberg
- Elected: 2025

Stadt Osnabrück (English: Osnabrück City) is an electoral constituency (German: Wahlkreis) represented in the Bundestag. It elects one member via first-past-the-post voting. Under the current constituency numbering system, it is designated as constituency 39. It is located in western Lower Saxony, comprising the independent city of Osnabrück.

Stadt Osnabrück was created for the inaugural 1949 federal election. From 2021-2025, it has been represented by Manuel Gava of the Social Democratic Party (SPD). Since 2025 it has been represented by Mathias Middelberg of the CDU.

== Geography ==
Stadt Osnabrück is located in western Lower Saxony. As of the 2021 federal election, it comprises the independent city of Osnabrück and the municipalities of Belm, Georgsmarienhütte, Hagen am Teutoburger Wald, Hasbergen, and Wallenhorst from the district of Osnabrück.

== History ==
Stadt Osnabrück was created in 1949, then known as Osnabrück-Stadt und -Land. In the 1965 through 1983 elections, it was simply named Osnabrück. It acquired its current name in the 1987 election. In the inaugural Bundestag election, it was Lower Saxony constituency 6 in the numbering system. From 1953 through 1961, it was number 28. From 1965 through 1998, it was number 33. In the 2002 and 2005 elections, it was number 39. In the 2009 election, it was number 40. Since the 2013 election, it has been number 39.

Originally, the constituency comprised the independent city of Osnabrück and the entirety of the district of Osnabrück, which at the time was significantly smaller than its present area. In the 1980 election, it acquired its current borders.

Election	No.	Name	Borders
1949	6	Osnabrück-Stadt und -Land	Osnabrück city; Osnabrück district
1953	28	Osnabrück-Stadt und -Land	Osnabrück city; Osnabrück district
1957	28	Osnabrück-Stadt und -Land	Osnabrück city; Osnabrück district
1961	28	Osnabrück-Stadt und -Land	Osnabrück city; Osnabrück district
1965	33	Osnabrück	Osnabrück city; Osnabrück district
1969	33	Osnabrück	Osnabrück city; Osnabrück district
1972	33	Osnabrück	Osnabrück city; Osnabrück district
1976	33	Osnabrück	Osnabrück city; Osnabrück district
1980	33	Osnabrück	Osnabrück city; Osnabrück district (only Belm, Georgsmarienhütte, Hagen am Teutoburger Wald, Hasbergen, and Wallenhorst municipalities)
1983	33	Osnabrück	Osnabrück city; Osnabrück district (only Belm, Georgsmarienhütte, Hagen am Teutoburger Wald, Hasbergen, and Wallenhorst municipalities)
1987	33	Stadt Osnabrück	Osnabrück city; Osnabrück district (only Belm, Georgsmarienhütte, Hagen am Teutoburger Wald, Hasbergen, and Wallenhorst municipalities)
1990	33	Stadt Osnabrück	Osnabrück city; Osnabrück district (only Belm, Georgsmarienhütte, Hagen am Teutoburger Wald, Hasbergen, and Wallenhorst municipalities)
1994	33	Stadt Osnabrück	Osnabrück city; Osnabrück district (only Belm, Georgsmarienhütte, Hagen am Teutoburger Wald, Hasbergen, and Wallenhorst municipalities)
1998	33	Stadt Osnabrück	Osnabrück city; Osnabrück district (only Belm, Georgsmarienhütte, Hagen am Teutoburger Wald, Hasbergen, and Wallenhorst municipalities)
2002	39	Stadt Osnabrück	Osnabrück city; Osnabrück district (only Belm, Georgsmarienhütte, Hagen am Teutoburger Wald, Hasbergen, and Wallenhorst municipalities)
2005	39	Stadt Osnabrück	Osnabrück city; Osnabrück district (only Belm, Georgsmarienhütte, Hagen am Teutoburger Wald, Hasbergen, and Wallenhorst municipalities)
2009	40	Stadt Osnabrück	Osnabrück city; Osnabrück district (only Belm, Georgsmarienhütte, Hagen am Teutoburger Wald, Hasbergen, and Wallenhorst municipalities)
2013	39	Stadt Osnabrück	Osnabrück city; Osnabrück district (only Belm, Georgsmarienhütte, Hagen am Teutoburger Wald, Hasbergen, and Wallenhorst municipalities)
2017	39	Stadt Osnabrück	Osnabrück city; Osnabrück district (only Belm, Georgsmarienhütte, Hagen am Teutoburger Wald, Hasbergen, and Wallenhorst municipalities)
2021	39	Stadt Osnabrück	Osnabrück city; Osnabrück district (only Belm, Georgsmarienhütte, Hagen am Teutoburger Wald, Hasbergen, and Wallenhorst municipalities)
2025	39	Stadt Osnabrück	Osnabrück city; Osnabrück district (only Belm, Georgsmarienhütte, Hagen am Teutoburger Wald, Hasbergen, and Wallenhorst municipalities)

== Members ==
The constituency was first held by Anton Storch of the Christian Democratic Union (CDU), who served from 1949 until 1965. He was succeeded by fellow CDU member Ferdinand Erpenbeck. In 1972, Alfred Emmerlich of the Social Democratic Party (SPD) won the constituency. In 1976, Karl-Heinz Hornhues of the CDU was elected representative, but Emmerlich won again in 1980. Hornhues was against elected in 1983, and served until 1998. In 1998, Ernst Schwanhold of the SPD won the constituency. He was succeeded by fellow SPD member Martin Schwanholz in 2002. Mathias Middelberg of the CDU was elected in 2009, and re-elected in 2013 and 2017. Manuel Gava regained it for the SPD in 2021.

Election	Member	Party	%
1949	Anton Storch	CDU	35.4
1953	Anton Storch	CDU	52.1
1957	Anton Storch	CDU	52.3
1961	Anton Storch	CDU	47.1
1965	Ferdinand Erpenbeck	CDU	50.0
1969	Ferdinand Erpenbeck	CDU	49.0
1972	Alfred Emmerlich	SPD	48.7
1976	Karl-Heinz Hornhues	CDU	48.8
1980	Alfred Emmerlich	SPD	49.4
1983	Karl-Heinz Hornhues	CDU	51.0
1987	Karl-Heinz Hornhues	CDU	45.8
1990	Karl-Heinz Hornhues	CDU	47.4
1994	Karl-Heinz Hornhues	CDU	46.8
1998	Ernst Schwanhold	SPD	47.8
2002	Martin Schwanholz	SPD	45.7
2005	Martin Schwanholz	SPD	44.1
2009	Mathias Middelberg	CDU	38.4
2013	Mathias Middelberg	CDU	45.7
2017	Mathias Middelberg	CDU	40.3
2021	Manuel Gava	SPD	30.3
2025	Mathias Middelberg	CDU	29.7

== Election results ==
=== 2025 election ===
Federal election (2025): Stadt Osnabrück
Notes:	Blue background denotes the winner of the electorate vote. Pink background denotes a candidate elected from their party list. Yellow background denotes an electorate win by a list member, or other incumbent. A ✓ or ✗ denotes status of any incumbent, win or lose respectively.						
Party	Candidate	Votes	%	±%	Party votes	%	±%
CDU	Mathias Middelberg	47,728	29.7	▲0.5	42,265	26.3	▲3.1
SPD	Thomas Vaupel	45,260	28.2	▼2.1	39,356	24.5	▼5.8
Greens	Luca Wirkus	21,953	13.7	▼9.4	25.670	16.0	▼7.3
Left	Heidi Reichinnek	18,862	11.8	▲7.0	17,804	11.1	▲6.9
AfD	Florian Meyer	18,264	11.4	▲6.9	18,544	11.5	▲6.9
FDP	Daniel Jutzi	4,178	2.6	▼4.2	6,650	4.1	▼5.7
BSW					5,511	3.4	
Volt	Dorothe Stahljans	1,962	1.2		1,259	0.8	▲0.4
Tierschutzpartei					1,325	0.8	0.0
FW	Andreas Möller	1,841	1.1		846	0.5	▲0.2
PARTEI					693	0.4	▼0.5
Independent	Tim Knauer	468	0.3				
dieBasis					426	0.3	▼0.7
Pirates					223	0.1	▼0.2
BD					141	0.1	
Humanists					108	0.1	0.0
MLPD					51	0.0	0.0
Informal votes		1,020			664		
Total valid votes		160,516			160,872		
Turnout		161,536	84.0	▲7.5			
CDU gain from SPD	Majority	2,468	1.5				

=== 2021 election ===
Federal election (2021): Stadt Osnabrück
Notes:	Blue background denotes the winner of the electorate vote. Pink background denotes a candidate elected from their party list. Yellow background denotes an electorate win by a list member, or other incumbent. A ✓ or ✗ denotes status of any incumbent, win or lose respectively.						
Party	Candidate	Votes	%	±%	Party votes	%	±%
SPD	Manuel Gava	44,876	30.3	▼1.4	44,919	30.2	▲5.5
CDU	✗ Mathias Middelberg	43,316	29.2	▼11.1	34,462	23.2	▼12.5
Greens	Thomas Klein	34,140	23.0	▲12.9	34,546	23.3	▲11.1
FDP	Nemir Ali	10,090	6.8	▼2.1	14,627	9.8	▲0.4
Left	Heidi Reichinnek	6,977	4.7	▼3.7	6,224	4.2	▼4.2
AfD	Florian Meyer	6,695	4.5		6,903	4.6	▼1.6
dieBasis	Maria Anita Haunhorst	1,918	1.3		1,482	1.0	
PARTEI					1,341	0.9	0.0
Tierschutzpartei					1,284	0.9	▲0.2
Team Todenhöfer					598	0.4	
FW					543	0.4	▲0.1
Volt					543	0.4	
Pirates					437	0.3	▼0.2
Humanists					153	0.1	
ÖDP					125	0.1	0.0
NPD					80	0.1	▼0.1
du.					79	0.1	
V-Partei3					76	0.1	▼0.1
DKP	Joachim Bigus	194	0.1	▼0.5	52	0.0	0.0
LKR					25	0.0	
MLPD					11	0.0	0.0
Informal votes		1,335			1,031		
Total valid votes		148,206			148,510		
Turnout		149,541	76.5	▼0.8			
SPD gain from CDU	Majority	1,560	1.1				

=== 2017 election ===
Federal election (2017): Stadt Osnabrück
Notes:	Blue background denotes the winner of the electorate vote. Pink background denotes a candidate elected from their party list. Yellow background denotes an electorate win by a list member, or other incumbent. A ✓ or ✗ denotes status of any incumbent, win or lose respectively.						
Party	Candidate	Votes	%	±%	Party votes	%	±%
CDU	✓ Mathias Middelberg	60,185	40.3	▼5.4	53,977	35.7	▼7.3
SPD	Antje Schulte-Schoh	47,279	31.6	▼3.2	37,336	24.7	▼5.8
Greens	Günther Westermann	15,108	10.1	▲1.2	18,353	12.1	▲1.2
FDP	Thomas Thiele	13,353	8.9	▲6.1	14,309	9.5	▲5.3
Left	Giesela Brandes-Steggewentz	12,521	8.4	▲4.2	12,759	8.4	▲3.3
AfD					9,499	6.3	▲3.6
PARTEI					1,361	0.9	
DKP	Joachim Bigus	962	0.6		77	0.1	
Tierschutzpartei					933	0.6	0.0
Pirates					702	0.5	▼1.5
BGE					402	0.3	
FW					344	0.2	▼0.1
DiB					264	0.2	
DM					232	0.2	
NPD					211	0.1	▼0.3
V-Partei³					209	0.1	
ÖDP					173	0.1	
MLPD					28	0.0	0.0
Informal votes		2,699			938		
Total valid votes		149,408			151,169		
Turnout		152,107	77.3	▲3.8			
CDU hold	Majority	12,906	8.7	▼2.2			

=== 2013 election ===
Federal election (2013): Stadt Osnabrück
Notes:	Blue background denotes the winner of the electorate vote. Pink background denotes a candidate elected from their party list. Yellow background denotes an electorate win by a list member, or other incumbent. A ✓ or ✗ denotes status of any incumbent, win or lose respectively.						
Party	Candidate	Votes	%	±%	Party votes	%	±%
CDU	✓ Mathias Middelberg	64,416	45.7	▲7.3	60,754	43.0	▲9.0
SPD	Martin Schwanholz	49,059	34.8	▲1.8	43,099	30.5	▲3.8
Greens	Dorothea Steiner	12,568	8.9	▼1.1	15,390	10.9	▼2.1
Left	Derk-Olaf Steggewentz	5,840	4.1	▼2.8	7,188	5.1	▼3.3
FDP	Thomas Thiele	3,934	2.8	▼7.6	5,874	4.2	▼9.8
AfD					3,765	2.7	
Pirates	Kerstin Demuth	3,102	2.2		2,794	2.0	▼0.2
NPD	Helmut Walter	884	0.6	0.0	652	0.5	▼0.1
FW	Robert Kiauka	828	0.6		472	0.3	
Tierschutzpartei					815	0.6	0.0
PBC	Ralf Gervelmeyer	290	0.2		226	0.2	
PRO					88	0.1	
REP					49	0.0	
MLPD					33	0.0	0.0
Informal votes		1,919			1,641		
Total valid votes		140,921			141,199		
Turnout		142,840	73.5	▼1.1			
CDU hold	Majority	15,357	10.9	▲5.5			

=== 2009 election ===
Federal election (2009): Stadt Osnabrück
Notes:	Blue background denotes the winner of the electorate vote. Pink background denotes a candidate elected from their party list. Yellow background denotes an electorate win by a list member, or other incumbent. A ✓ or ✗ denotes status of any incumbent, win or lose respectively.						
Party	Candidate	Votes	%	±%	Party votes	%	±%
CDU	Mathias Middelberg	54,522	38.4	▼2.1	48,398	34.0	▼1.7
SPD	✗ Martin Schwanholz	46,979	33.1	▼11.1	38,000	26.7	▼13.3
FDP	Carl-Ludwig Thiele	14,823	10.4	▲5.1	19,941	14.0	▲4.8
Greens	Dorothea Steiner	14,282	10.0	▲3.8	18,463	13.0	▲3.3
Left	Maren Kaminski	9,918	7.0	▲3.8	11,878	8.3	▲4.7
Pirates					3,168	2.2	
NPD	Jochim Schnell	945	0.7	▼0.1	848	0.6	▼0.1
Tierschutzpartei					880	0.6	▲0.2
Independent	Volker Stöckel	658	0.5				
RRP					443	0.3	
ÖDP					216	0.2	
DVU					88	0.1	
MLPD					18	0.0	0.0
Informal votes		1,584			1,370		
Total valid votes		142,127			142,341		
Turnout		143,711	74.7	▼5.6			
CDU gain from SPD	Majority	7,543	5.3				

=== 2005 election ===
Federal election (2005):Stadt Osnabrück
Notes:	Blue background denotes the winner of the electorate vote. Pink background denotes a candidate elected from their party list. Yellow background denotes an electorate win by a list member, or other incumbent. A ✓ or ✗ denotes status of any incumbent, win or lose respectively.						
Party	Candidate	Votes	%	±%	Party votes	%	±%
SPD	✓ Martin Schwanholz	67,136	44.1	▼1.5	60,941	40.0	▼3.4
CDU	Mathias Middelberg	61,467	40.4	▲1.7	54,431	35.7	▼1.0
Greens	Dieter Reinhardt	9,528	6.3	▼0.5	14,734	9.7	▲0.1
FDP	Carl-Ludwig Thiele	8,038	5.3	▼2.4	14,015	9.2	▲1.1
Left	Marianne König	4,801	3.2	▲2.2	5,615	3.7	▲2.7
NPD	Christian Heising	1,120	0.7		1,056	0.7	▲0.5
Tierschutzpartei					605	0.4	▲0.1
GRAUEN					431	0.3	▲0.1
PBC					286	0.2	▲0.1
Pro German Center – Pro D-Mark Initiative					85	0.1	
MLPD					61	0.0	
BüSo					47	0.0	0.0
Informal votes		1,865			1,648		
Total valid votes		152,090			152,307		
Turnout		153,955	80.3	▼1.3			
SPD hold	Majority	5,669	3.7				
