= Catasetum aculeatum =

Scientific classification
- Kingdom: Plantae
- Clade: Tracheophytes
- Clade: Angiosperms
- Clade: Monocots
- Order: Asparagales
- Family: Orchidaceae
- Subfamily: Epidendroideae
- Genus: Catasetum
- Species: C. aculeatum

Binomial name
- Catasetum aculeatum F.E.Miranda & K.G.Lacerda (1992)
- The distribution of the Catasetum aculeatum

Species of orchid

Catasetum aculeatum, the pointed catasetum, is an epiphytic pseudobulbeous species of orchid native to northern Brazil.

== Description ==
Catasetum aculeatum blooms in the fall with pseudobulbs that are clustered, fusiform, and erect. Its flowers are 2 cm (0.79 in) in size and are usually fully green, sometimes having black spots at its petals. It also can shoot pollinium onto its pollinators which are usually Euglossine bees.

== Care ==
Catasetum aculeatum is a sun-loving plant that needs around 45000 lux, 55% shade, and 70% humidity. It also goes into a leaf-drop state during winter like other Catasetum species.

== Distribution ==
Catasetum aculeatum is endemic to Brazil specifically in the states of Amazonas, Pará, Amapá, Toncantins, Rondônia, Roraima, and Acre. It is usually found in wet, tropical places at elevations of 50 to 100 meters.

== Taxonomy and etymology ==
Catasetum aculeatum was first published in Bradea 6:46 by F.E.L.Miranda & K.G.Lacerda in 1992.
