= John Seaward =

British writer

- Born: January 1786; Lambeth, London, England
- Died: 26 March 1858 (aged 72); Camden, London, England
- Spouse: Mary Elizabeth Seaward
- Engineering career
- Institutions: Institution of Civil Engineers

John Seaward (January 1786 - 26 March 1858) was a British civil engineer and mechanical engineer. His brother was Samuel Seaward, FRS (see below).

== Early life ==
Seaward was born the son of a builder in Lambeth, London, in January 1786, and initially worked with his father as a surveyor and architect.

== Career ==
=== Early career ===
After working for his father, John was first employed by Grillier & Company, the contractors for the erection of Regent's Bridge across the River Thames, to supervise the work. During this period he became acquainted with Jeremy Bentham and James Walker and his uncle, Ralph Walker.

Following this, John managed some lead mines in Wales, where he spent several years. Here he also acquired knowledge of chemistry, which later proved very useful. In this part of the country John became friendly with Arthur Woolf, Richard Trevithick, and other mechanical engineers of the period.

Upon his return to London John oversaw the construction of Gordon's, Dowson's, and other docks on the River Thames. He also became an agent for the Gospel Oak Ironworks in Staffordshire. During this time he was connected with the Imperial Continental Gas Association and introduced gas lighting to several towns in France, Belgium, and the Netherlands.

In 1823 John drew plans for a new London Bridge. It was to have three arches, each of 230 feet (70 m) span. In his Observations on the Rebuilding of London Bridge, he mathematically demonstrated that it could be done. This brought him into connection with Humphry Davy, Davies Gilbert, Ewart and other scientists.

=== Canal Iron Works ===
In 1824 John established the Canal Iron Works at Millwall, London, for the construction of all kinds of machinery, but in particular the construction of marine engines. In 1825 it constructed the engine for the vessel the Royal George, which was intended for the Dover - Calais service. He joined the Institution of Civil Engineers as a member in 1826, and was a frequent attendant at the meetings.

John's younger brother, Samuel Seaward (1800–1842), joined him in about 1826. The brothers produced machinery for every part of the world, and made the name of Seaward widely known. In 1829 they assisted in the formation of the Diamond Steam Packet Company, and built the engines for the boats which ran between Gravesend and London. Of these, the Ruby and the Sapphire were types for speed and for accommodation.

In 1836 the brothers brought out the direct-acting steam engines for HMS Gorgon and HMS Cyclops, which were known as Seaward's engines. They superseded the heavy side-beam engines of the period which had been in general use. The saving obtained in the consumption of fuel by the double-slide valve, both for the steam and exhaust, plus other improvements, caused the government to entrust the Seawards with the building of twenty-four steamboats and some smaller vessels.

At the same time they adapted their engines to the vessels of the East India Company, the Steam Navigation Companies, and vessels for foreign governments. They were also early advocates of the use of auxiliary steam power for the voyage to India, and experimented with it on the East Indiaman Vernon in 1839 and 1840 with great success

They also designed large swing bridges, dredging machines, cranes, and other dock apparatus, plus machinery for lead, saw, and sugar mills. Among the improvements and inventions for which John Seaward was personally responsible were tubular boilers, which were used by the Royal Navy, disconnecting cranks for paddle-wheel engines, the telescopic funnel, self-acting nozzles for feed and for regulating the saturation of the water in marine boilers, double passages in cylinders both for steam and education, cheese-couplings used to connect and disconnect screw propellers to and from engines, and other minor improvements.

The death of Samuel Seaward, on 11 May 1842 threw upon John Seaward the entire management of the Canal Iron Works. In the construction of the 800 hp (600 kW) engines of the RMS Amazon, he is considered to have produced one of his most perfect works. The vessel unfortunately was destroyed by fire on her first passage to the West Indies on 4 January 1852.

John Seaward died at 20 Brecknock Crescent, London, on 26 March 1858.

== Publications ==
- Observations on the Rebuilding of London Bridge, with an examination of the Arch of Equilibrium proposed by Dr. Hutton, and an investigation of a new method for forming an arch of that description (1824)
- Observations on the Advantages and Possibility of successfully employing Steam Power in navigating Ships between this country and the East Indies (1829)
- Various articles for Thomas Tredgold's The Steam Engine (1850), including "Steam Navigation", "Vessels of Iron and Wood", the "Steam Engine", and "Screw Propulsion".
