= Erzbahn =

Erzbahn is a German language term meaning a railway with which ore is transported, it may refer to:

- The Malmbanan (literal: the ore railway line) Erzbahn is a railway line in northern Sweden crossing into Norway to the port of Narvik
- The Erzbahn (Bochum) is a former railway line in the Ruhr (Germany), now in part a bicycle trail.
- The Perm-Bahn - a former railway line operated by the Georgs-Marien-Bergwerks- und Hüttenverein between the 'Perm mine' at Ibbenbüren and Hasbergen.
