= Amazonia (disambiguation) =

Amazonia refers to the Amazon rainforest.

Amazonia may also refer to:

== Places ==
- Amazonia, Missouri, a village in the US
- Amazon basin, the river basin drained by the Amazon River
- Amazon biome, a biome that covers most of the Amazon basin and some adjoining areas
- Amazon natural region, a region of Colombia
- Amazon Region (Ecuador)
- Amazônia Legal, the largest socio-geographic division in Brazil
- Amazônia National Park, Brazil
- Amazonian craton, a craton in the Precambrian
- North Region, Brazil, also known as Amazônia
- Peruvian Amazon, the portion of the Amazon basin in Peru

== Arts, entertainment, and media ==
=== Films ===
- Amazonia (film), a 2013 documentary film
- White Slave (film), a 1985 horror film, also known as Amazonia: The Catherine Miles Story

=== Other uses in arts, entertainment, and media ===
- Amazonia (2002), an action-adventure novel by James Rollins
- Amazônia (album), a 2021 album by Jean-Michel Jarre
- Amazonia, a fictional kingdom of women in The Book of the City of Ladies
- Wonder Woman: Amazonia, a one-shot comic book about Wonder Woman
- "Amazonia", the second single from the 2021 album Fortitude (album) by Gojira

== Other uses ==
- Amazonia (fungus), a genus of fungi
- Amazônia-1, a Brazilian satellite
- Amazonian languages, the indigenous languages of "Greater Amazonia"
- MV Geysir, a cargo ship originally named Amazonia
- The Amazonia Conference, a global warming activist organization
- Universidad de la Amazonía (University of the Amazon), a public university in Florencia, Caquetá, Colombia

== See also ==
- Amazon (disambiguation)
- Amazonis Planitia
