= Amason =

Amason may refer to:

- Alvin Eli Amason (born 1948), Sugpiaq Alaskan painter and sculptor
- Amason Kingi, Kenyan politician
- Amason (band), a Swedish music band

== See also ==
- Amazon (disambiguation)
