= Amazonen-Werke =

German manufacturer of agricultural machinery and municipal machinery

AMAZONEN-WERKE H. Dreyer SE & Co. KG
- Type: SE & Co. KG
- Industry: Agricultural machinery manufacturing, Agriculture
- Founded: Hasbergen-Gaste (1883)
- Founder: Heinrich Dreyer
- Headquarters: Hasbergen, Germany
- Area served: Worldwide
- Key people: Christian Dreyer; Justus Dreyer
- Products: Fertiliser Spreaders, Sprayers, Seed drills, Soil tillage machinery, Ploughs, Inter-row hoes, and Park and green space maintenance and Winter salt spreading machinery
- Services: Parts, service, training
- Revenue: €850 million (2025)
- Number of employees: 2,700 (2025)
- Website: www.amazone.net

Amazonen-Werke (stylised as AMAZONEN-WERKE H. DREYER SE & Co. KG) is a German manufacturer of agricultural machinery and greenspace maintenance equipment. The company and main factory were founded in 1883 by Heinrich Dreyer and are located in Hasbergen-Gaste near Osnabrück. Amazone produces a wide range of products including fertiliser spreaders, sprayers, seed drills, soil tillage machinery, ploughs, inter-row hoes alongside park and green space maintenance and winter salt spreading machinery.

== History of the name ==
In 1891, Heinrich Dreyer wanted to give a name to his most successful machine, a grain cleaner. A local teacher from Gaste suggested the name of "Amazone" referring to the female warriors from Greek mythology. Dreyer accepted the suggestion and had the name registered as a trademark.

In 1912, the company Maschinenfabrik H. Dreyer was renamed Amazonenwerk. The main reason for this change was due to confusion with his brother Wilhelm, who went by the name Heinrich Wilhelm Dreyer and was a competitor.

== History of the company ==
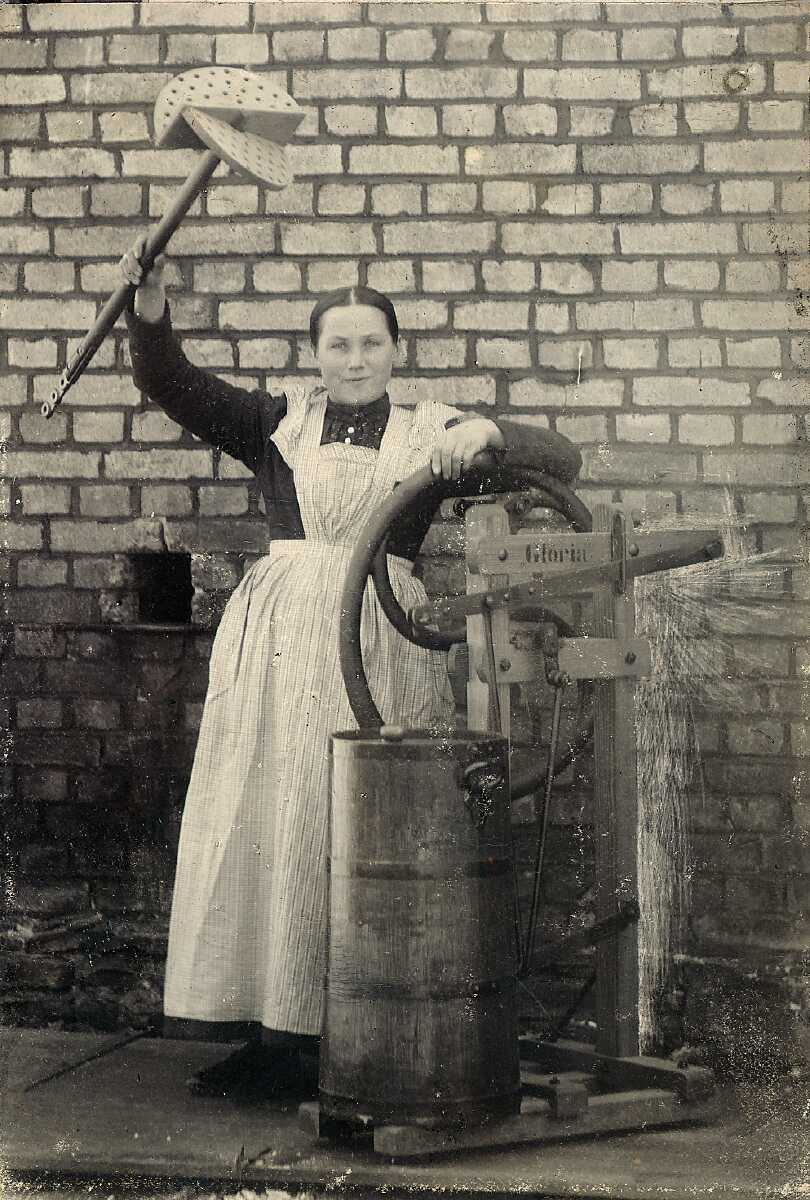
Mrs. Dreyer in 1902 as the first Amazone model

As early as the 18th century, the Dreyer family, who were active in agriculture, carpentry, and wheelwrighting, became involved in the construction of agricultural machinery and equipment and produced several winnowers each year for cleaning grain: for example, in 1778, Heinrich Dreyer’s great-grandfather, Johann Caspar Dreyer, delivered a winnower to the city of Osnabrück. Heinrich Dreyer founded Amazone in 1883. The first production machines were the grain cleaners, later tine cultivators, potato sorters and in 1915 the first fertiliser spreader was brought to the market. From those early days, Heinrich Dreyer began to export his machinery; in 1906 the first grain cleaners were sold in Valparaíso, Chile. He substantiated this with his slogan: "We must go out into the world".

With the outbreak of World War I, business collapsed abruptly. All young men were immediately drafted into military service, reducing the workforce to around 40 employees after the company had already been temporarily shut down entirely. In the years after 1934, the Amazone auger spreaders and potato sorting machines experienced a significant boom, leading to the expansion of the workforce in Gaste to more than 500 employees by 1939. This upswing was also the result of substantial government support for agriculture following the National Socialists’ rise to power in Germany. In 1934, the founder’s sons, Erich and Heinrich, took over the business. Heinrich Dreyer Sr. died on June 11, 1939, just a few months before the outbreak of World War II. Heinrich Dreyer Jr. was a member of the SA from 1934 to 1938 and subsequently joined the NSDAP.

During World War II, Panzer Regiment 6 "Neuruppin" and three other companies were temporarily quartered at the Amazone factory. Male employees fit for military service—including Erich Dreyer, the company’s commercial director—were drafted into the armed forces, due to which the workforce over time significantly reduced. The missing workers were replaced by assigned prisoners of war. On April 18, 1945, Erich Dreyer was killed in what was then Czechoslovakia.

On November 28, 1957, Heinrich Dreyer died suddenly and unexpectedly at the age of 57. On January 2, 1958, Heinz Dreyer and Klaus Dreyer took over the management of Amazone as the third generation of the family.

In 1942, the first potato harvesters were introduced to the market, in 1949, the seed drill and then in 1959, a manure spreader. In the 1960s, Amazone achieved market leadership through the success of its twin-disc ZA fertiliser spreaders and the D4 seed drill. In 1967, the company entered the tillage market and developed a PTO-driven reciprocrating harrow that could be used in conjunction with a seed drill. Additionally, a rotary harrow and rotary cultivator were introduced. After German reunification, a range of passive soil tillage machinery was added to the product range following the acquisition of BBG Bodenbearbeitungsgeräte in Leipzig in 1998. In 1987, Amazone introduced its first precision seeder.

In 1999, Christian Dreyer took over management from his father, Klaus Dreyer. At the end of 2005, Justus Dreyer, the son of Heinz Dreyer, also joined the management team, completing the involvement of the 4th generation of both Dreyer families..

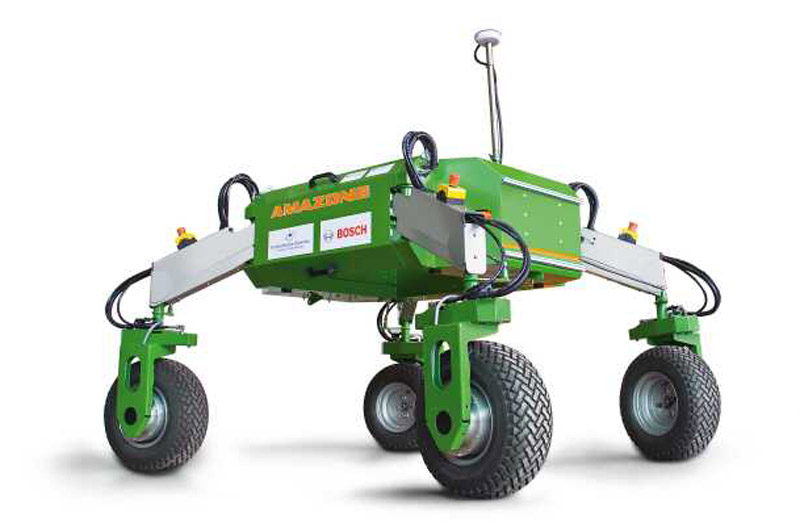
Amazone BoniRob Field robot

In 2008, the Amazone Foundation was established to support outstanding students and their final theses in the field of agricultural engineering. In 2009, Amazone established a new manufacturing site for the production of large seeders in Hude-Altmoorhausen and began with the production of a self-propelled sprayer, the Pantera, at its production site in Leeden, near Tecklenburg. In addition, the BoniRob, an autonomous field robot for individual plant-based experimental research, was presented that had been developed in cooperation with the University of Applied Sciences Osnabrück, the Robert Bosch GmbH as well as other partners. In January 2010, a new fertiliser spreader test hall was opened in Hasbergen-Gaste. This has enabled the company to complete fertiliser spreading tests with a working width of up to 72 metres (236 ft) as well as to study new types of fertilisers regarding their mass and spreading properties. This information can then be added to the Amazone fertiliser database thus enabling the company to easily advise customers on their machine settings. This test hall is state-of-the-art and a unique feature for a mid-sized company; no other manufacturer has such a facility.

After the huge success at the first Amatechnica, the in-house Amazone field day in May 2005, this event has been regularly repeated on a 2-year cycle since. Customers and prospective customers from around the world are shown demonstrations of new and current agricultural machinery.

In February 2011, Amazone sold the bulk material-storage division. In September 2016, Amazone acquired the plough production operation from the insolvent plough manufacturer, Vogel & Noot. Then, effective from January 1, 2019, Amazone acquired the inter-row hoe division of Maschinenfabrik Schmotzer.

Since June 2020, Amazone has been conducting a long-term arable farming trial project at the new Wambergen experimental farm. Under the name "Controlled Row Farming" (CRF), a new arable farming system for agriculture is being introduced, in which every crop-related measure is carried out in relation to a fixed row spacing.

In June 2022, Amazone invested in a collaboration with the startup company AgXeed B.V., which develops autonomous field robots. In April 2024, Amazone acquired the Brazilian fertilizer spreader manufacturer MP Agro and thus expanded its presence in the South American market.

== Company structure ==
All shares of the company, which has its headquarters in Hasbergen near Osnabrück, are fully owned by the two Dreyer families. Heinrich Dreyer, the original founder of Amazone, had two sons. It was decided that each of his sons would receive half ownership of the company, but only one of their children would be allowed to carry on the company. Amazone is now in its fourth generation with Christian Dreyer, son of Klaus Dreyer, and Justus Dreyer, son of (SAA Samara) Heinz Dreyer.

The company employs a total workforce of around 2,700 people. In 2025, turnover amounted to €850 million, representing an increase of 11.4% compared to the previous year. Amazone's customers are farmers, agricultural contractors, local councils and related areas.

The logo of the company is an Amazone woman riding a horse. Both agricultural and groundcare machinery uses an orange logo and the machine livey is green and orange.

=== Manufacturing facilities ===
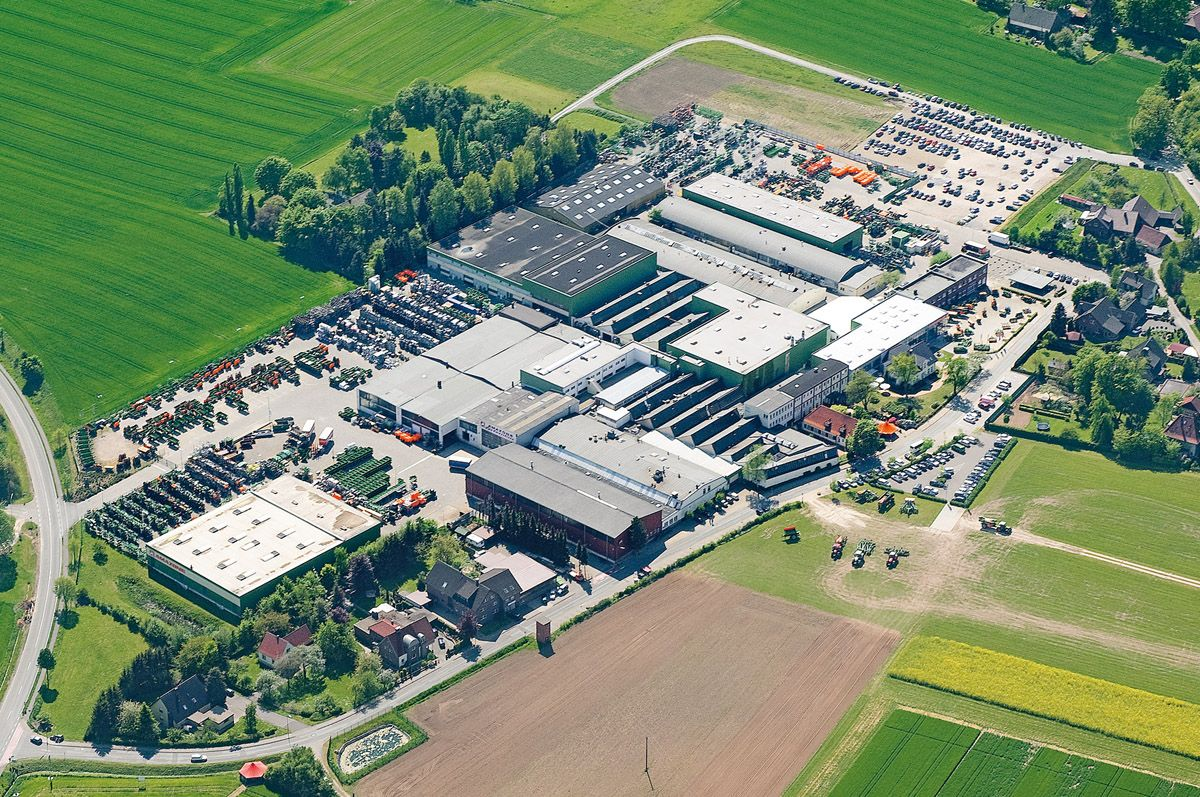
Amazone headquarters in Hasbergen-Gaste near Osnabrück, Germany.

Amazone also has manufacturing facilities in the following locations:

- Hasbergen-Gaste (headquarters): manufacture of mounted fertiliser spreaders.
- Bramsche: manufacture of mounted, trailed, and self-propelled crop protection sprayers and trailed fertiliser spreaders.
- Hude-Altmoorhausen: manufacture of seed drills.
- Hude near Oldenburg: manufacture of PTO-driven soil tillage implements, such as rotary harrows and rotary cultivators.
- Leipzig: manufacture of non-powered soil tillage implements, such as disc harrows and cultivators, as well as inter-row hoes for mechanical weed control (formerly Rudolph Sack GmbH and BBG Bodenbearbeitungsgeräte Leipzig).
- Mosonmagyaróvár (Hungary): manufacture of ploughs (formerly Vogel & Noot Mezögépgyár Kft.).
- Forbach (France): manufacture of groundcare machinery such as winter grit spreaders and green area maintenance equipment.
- Leeden (district of Tecklenburg): Spare parts warehouse and used machinery centre.
- Ibaté (Brazil): MP Agro, a subsidiary acquired in 2024.

In Germany, Amazone operates four four local sales and service centres: in Rendsburg, Gottin, Kottenheim, and Gablingen. In addition, there are sales locations outside Germany in China, the United Kingdom, France, Ukraine, Romania, Hungary, Russia, Canada, USA, Poland and Kazakhstan.

=== Product range ===
Amazone manufactures a range of soil tillage implements, seed drills, precision planters, fertiliser spreaders, crop protection sprayers, and inter-row hoes in various designs, as well as machinery for park and green area maintenance and winter grit spreading. Additionally, Amazone carries out arable farming projects and field trials. Until 2011, another line of business was the planning and construction of multi-purpose storage halls.

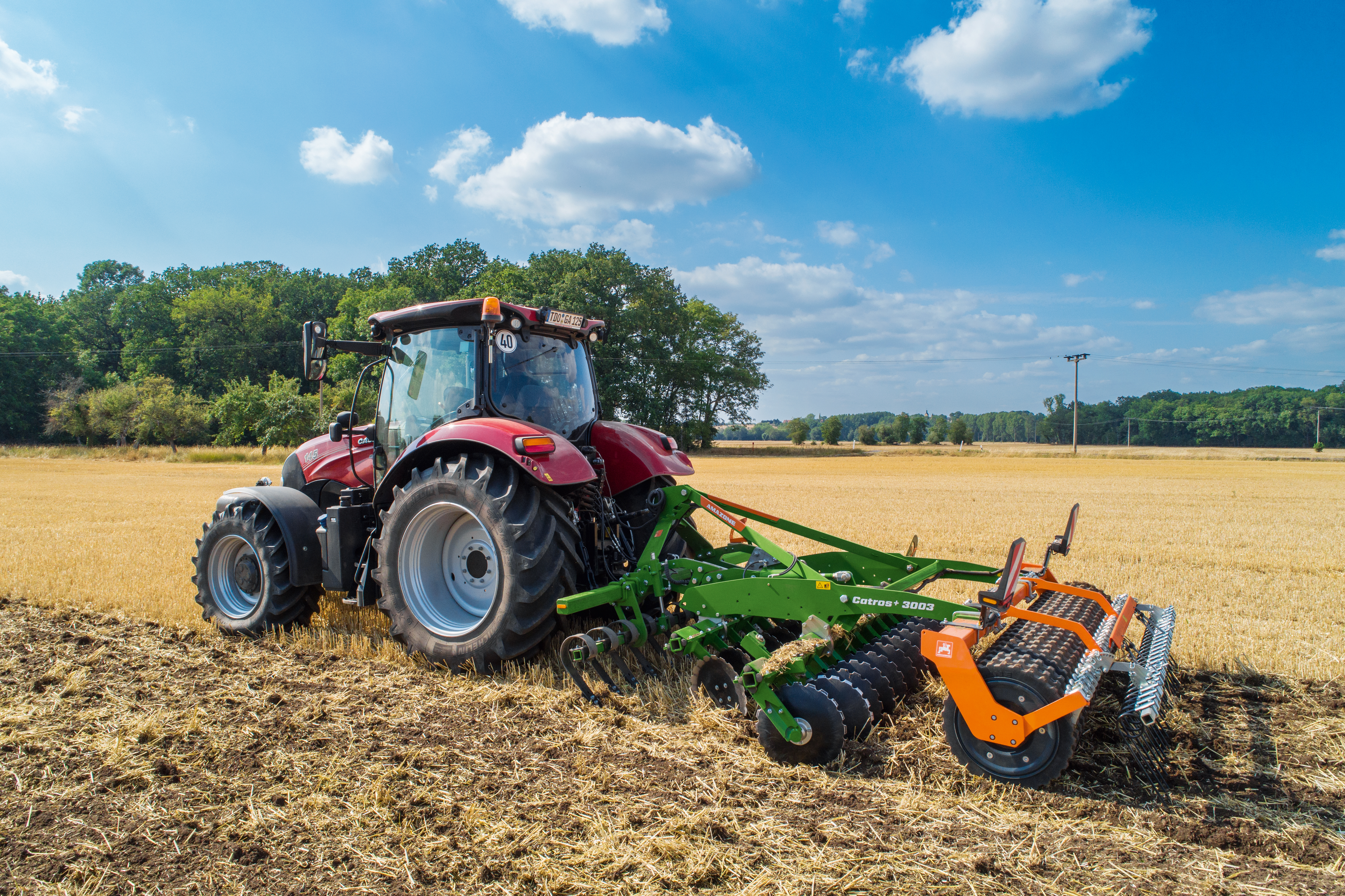
Anbau-Kompaktscheibenegge Catros

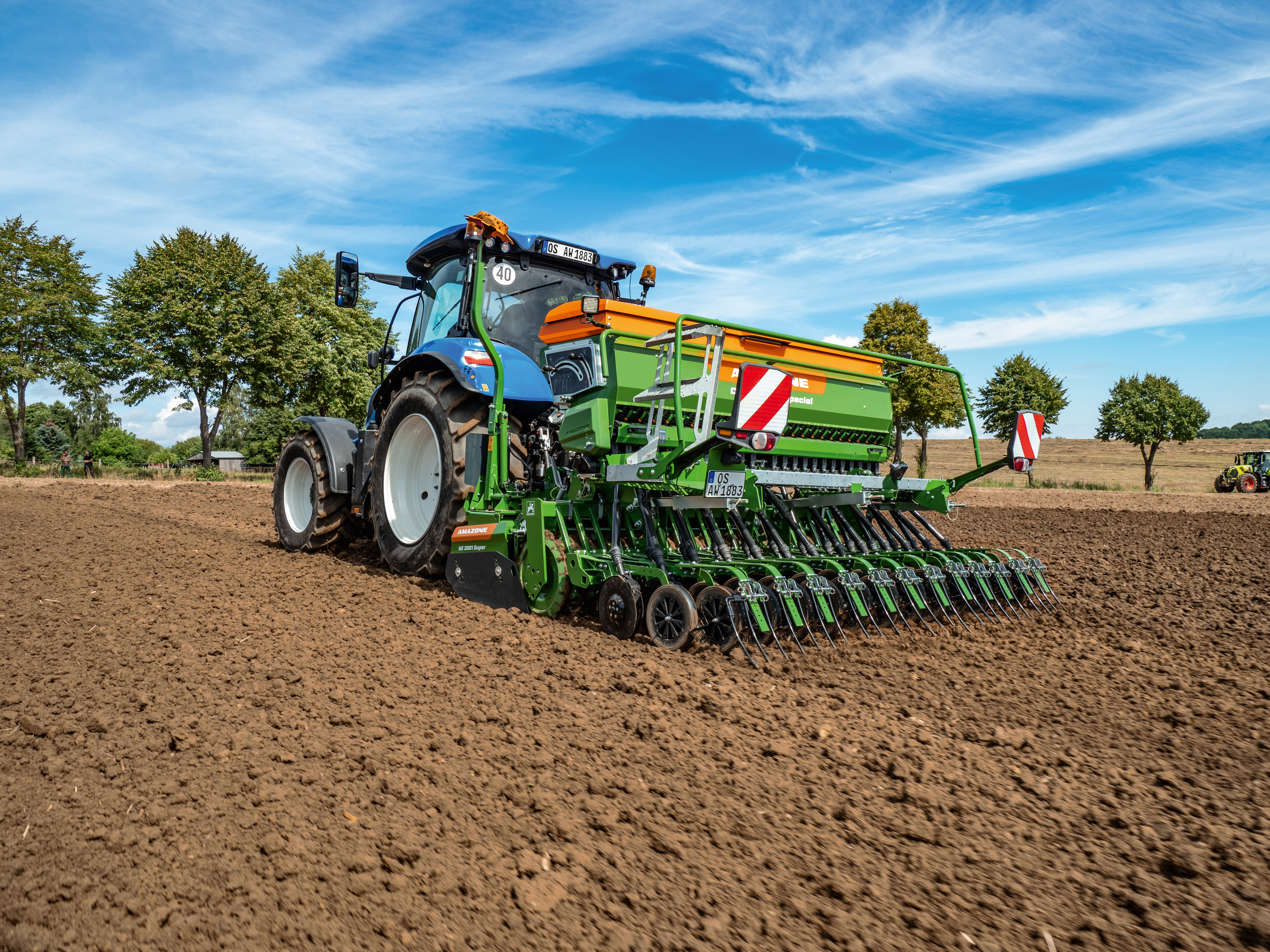
Mechanische Anbau-Sämaschine Cataya auf Kreiselegge aufgebaut

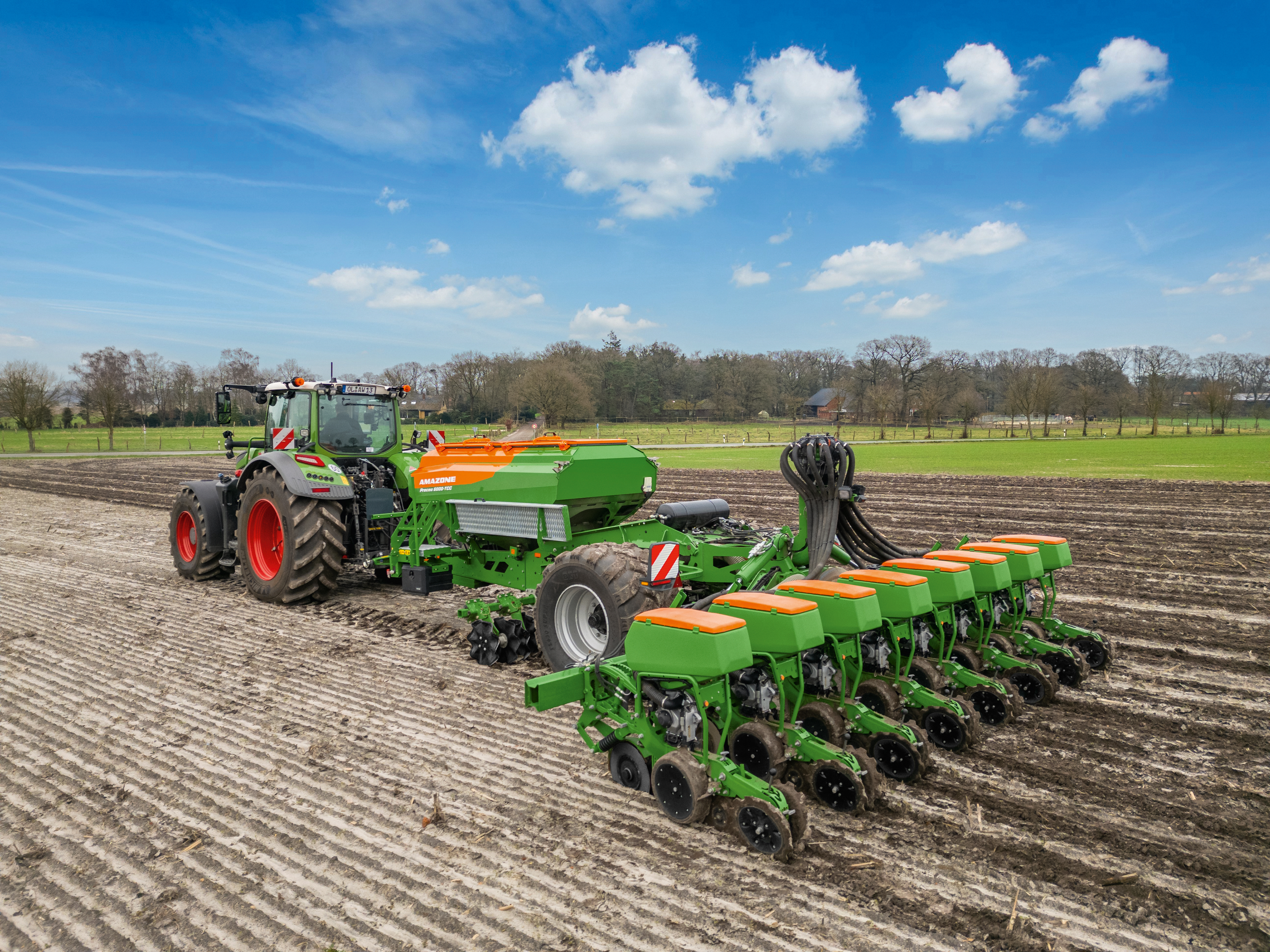
Anhänge-Einzelkorn-Sämaschine Precea TCC

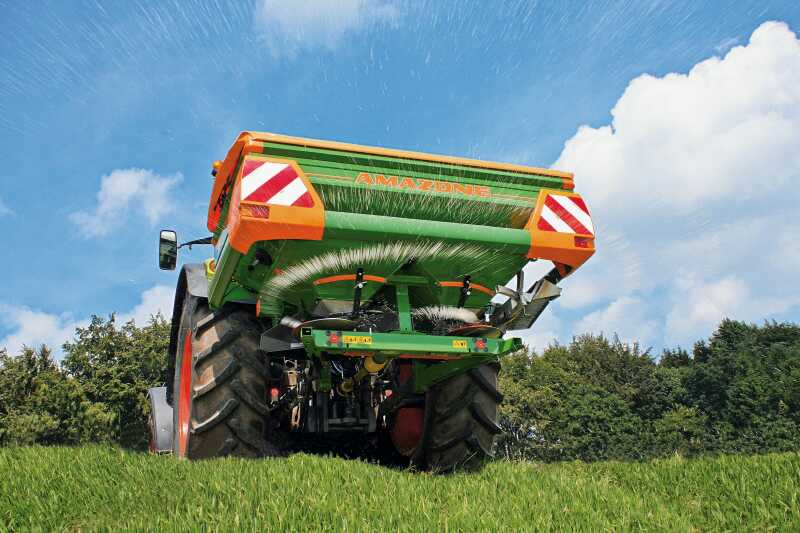
Anbaustreuer ZA-M 1001

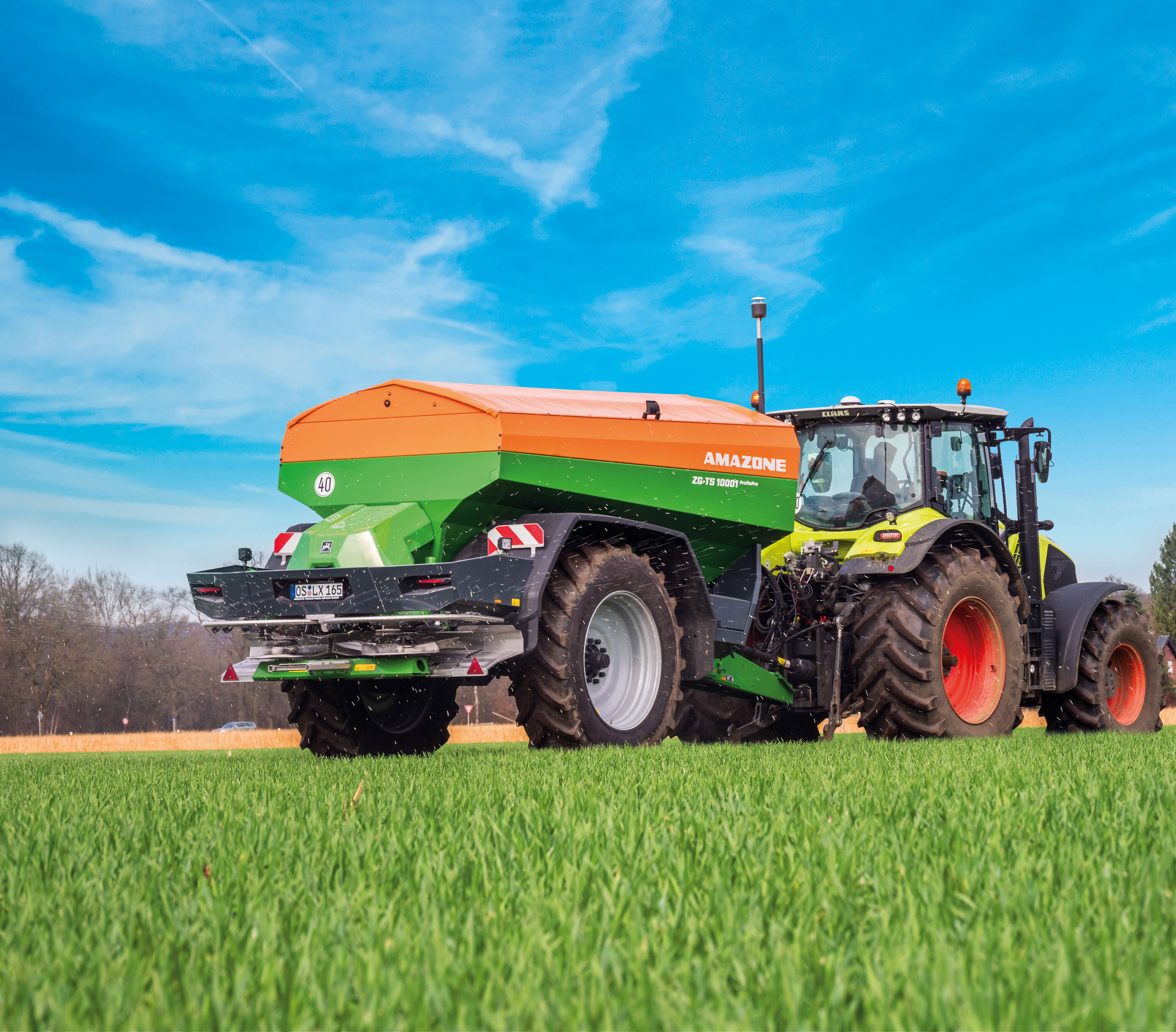
Anhängestreuer ZG-TS

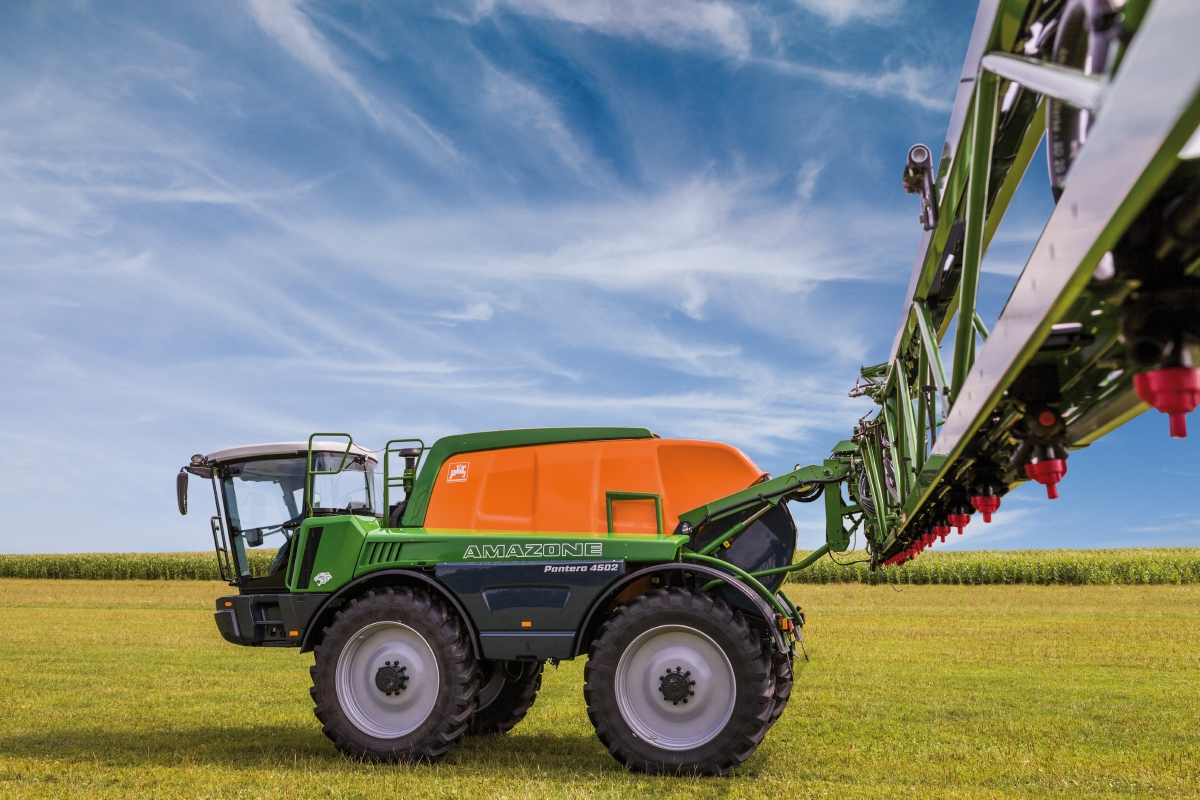
Selbstfahrende Pflanzenschutzspritze Pantera 4502

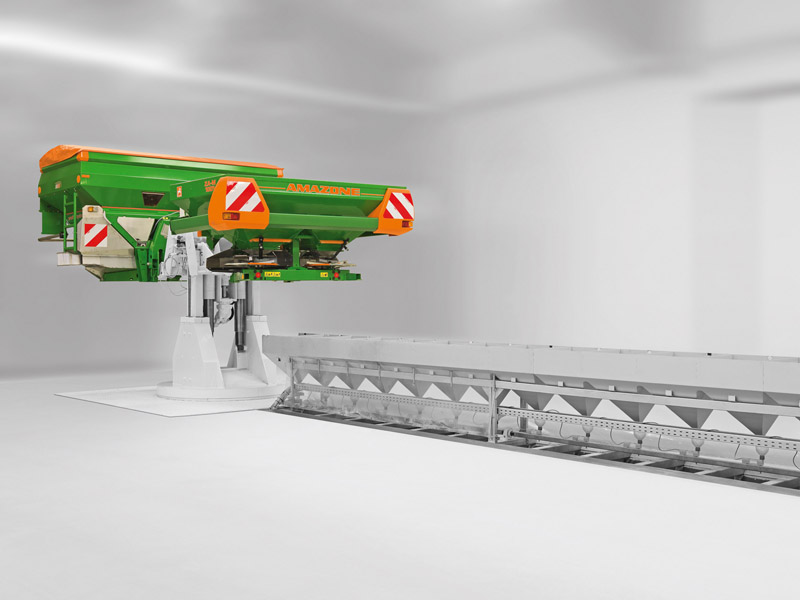
Die neue Testhalle für Düngerstreuer und Düngemittel

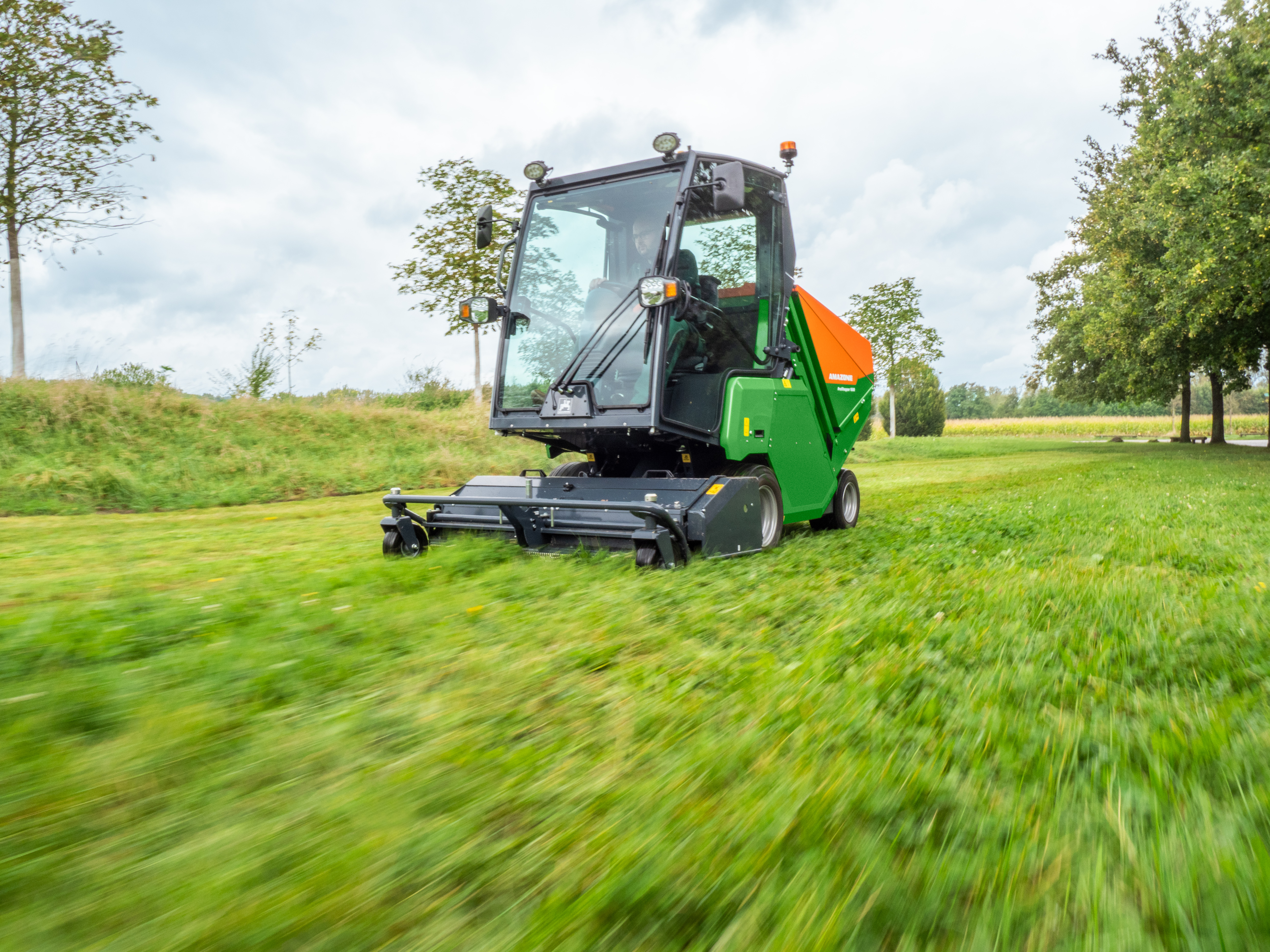
Profihopper 1500 Cab

=== Patents and intellectual property ===
According to a 2018 report by Neue Osnabrücker Zeitung, Amazone files around 70 patents each year as first or new applications. At that time, the company employed roughly 120 people in research and development. Many employees also work part-time as farmers and are involved in new product testing. The company holds several hundred active patents, including several dozen in the United States. These patents include, for example:

- LED spray-fan illumination on crop protection sprayers, in which each nozzle is equipped with a corresponding light source.
- The EasyCheck system, a method in which mats are placed in the field, spread across with fertiliser in a single pass with a spreader, and subsequently analysed using digital imaging to determine the fertiliser distribution.
- A method for planning a seeding operation by determining the layout of tramlines and interrupting seed application to create tramlines that cross or deviate from the standard driving pattern.

== Awards ==
- 2019: Lower Saxony Foreign Trade Award (Niedersächsischer Außenwirtschaftspreis) presented by the State of Lower Saxony for export achievements
- 2023: Silver Innovation Award at Agritechnica for CurveControl for centrifugal spreaders
- 2024: Ranked No. 1 overall in Germany’s Most Innovative Mid-Sized Companies 2024, awarded by Munich Strategy and Wirtschaftswoche
- 2024: Farm Machine award in the seeding category for the Precea-TCC
- 2025: DLG Image Barometer 2024/2025, which evaluates brand strength in agribusiness: 4th place
- 2025: Germany’s Most Innovative Mid-Sized Companies by Stern: Ranked 1st in the category Agriculture and Agricultural Engineering, ranked 3rd overall. The assessment was based on patents granted and citations of those patents between January 1 and December 31, 2024.
- 2025: Silver Innovation Award at Agritechnica for ZA-TS 01 AutoSpread and EasyMatch
- 2025: Farm Machine award in the crop management category for ZA-TS 01 AutoSpread
- 2025: Farm Machine award in the seeding category for Cirrus 04 / Precea with EasyTram

== Literature ==
- Dreyer, Klaus (2003). Die Amazone-Chronik. Landwirtschaftsverlag GmbH. ISBN 3-7843-3229-3.
- Dreyer, Klaus (2009). Die Geschichte der BBG – von Rudolph Sack bis Amazone. DLG-Verlag. ISBN 978-3-7690-0750-3.
- DLG-Verlag (2008). 125 Jahre Amazone. DLG-Verlag. ISBN 978-3-7690-0709-1.
