= Amazonian =

Amazonian may refer to:

- Amazonian (Mars), a geologic system and time period on the planet Mars
- Amazon River, in South America
  - Amazon basin, that river's drainage basin
  - Amazon rainforest, rainforest covering most of the Amazon Basin
- Relating to the Amazons, female warrior tribe in Greek mythology
- Amazonian, an employee of the company Amazon.com
- Amazonian, a fictional species in the Futurama episode "Amazon Women in the Mood"
- Amazonians, people who live in the Amazon basin
  - Indigenous peoples in Brazil

== See also ==
- Amazon (disambiguation)
