= Looking for Love (Connie Francis song) =

Single by Connie Francis

from the album Connie Francis Sings Songs from Her New MGM Motion Picture "Looking for Love"
- B-side: "This Is My Happiest Moment"
- Released: 1964
- Genre: Rock'n'roll, pop
- Label: MGM Records

Connie Francis US singles chronology
"Be Anything (But Be Mine)" (1964)	"Looking for Love" (1964)	"Don't Ever Leave Me" (1964)

Audio
- "Looking for Love" on YouTube

"Looking for Love" is a song by Connie Francis that served as the title song for her 1964 MGM motion picture Looking for Love.

== Release and reception ==
Billboard reviewed the single (MGM 13256, b/w "This Is My Happiest Moment") on June 11, 1964, writing: "Medium tempo rocker [...]. Groovy beat and lyrics should register with the younger set."

== Charts ==
Chart (1964)	Peak position
US Billboard Hot 100	45
