= Marlene (Japanese singer) =

Filipino-born Japanese jazz vocalist

Marlene (マリーン, Marīn; born 4 January 1960) is a Filipina jazz vocalist from Manila, Philippines mainly active in Japan. Her real name has been cited as Marlene dela Peña or Marlene Pena Lim. Marlene moved to Japan in the late 1970s and released her first single through EMI Japan in 1979 before signing a contract with CBS Sony in 1981, recording albums twice a year. In 1983 two of her albums appeared on the Oricon charts. Deja Vu reached #8, while Magic (sometimes listed as It's Magic in English) reached #5, each enjoying sales of over 150,000 records.

In the United States, Marlene is known for her work with Seawind, with whom she recorded her second album Summer Nights in Los Angeles in 1982. and her album Stay With Me which reached No. 28 in the Billboard Adult Contemporary Chart in the 90’s. Her sixth album, Looking for Love, was also recorded in Los Angeles in 1984. With the Mal Waldron/Billy Holiday composition Left alone recorded on the soundtrack of the Haruki Kadokawa movie Kyabare (Cabaret) she scored a hit in Japan in 1986. She has recorded 31 albums in total so far and is the highest paid Pinay jazz artist in Japan. In 2016 she teamed up with Jiro Yoshida, Makoto Kuriya and released the album Cubic Magic under the group name Threesome, followed by the album Whatever! in 2017. Marlene was the subject of Mundo ni Juan sa Japan, a television film documentary in 2015.

She has appeared in two Japanese films — Nantonaku (2007) and Karanukan (2017), where she played the character "Yukie".

== Discography ==
Studio albums

Year / Album / Label; 1981 / Just Like First Love / CBS/Sony; 1982 / Summer Nights (with Seawind Horns) / CBS/Sony; 1982 / My Favorite Songs / CBS/Sony; 1983 / Déjà Vu / CBS/Sony; 1983 / (It's Magic) / CBS/Sony; 1984 / Looking For Love / Sony Music; 1984 / Foot Print - Best Selection / CBS/Sony; 1985 / Be Pop / CBS/Sony; 1985 / Softly, As A Morning Sunrise / CBS/Sony; 1986 / Just A Woman / CBS/Sony; 1987 / This Time / CBS/Sony; 1988 / Affection / CBS/Sony; 1988 / Stay Beautiful / CBS/Sony; 1988 / Left Alone / CBS/Sony; 1989 / Stylish / CBS/Sony; 1990 / The Best Of Marlene / CBS/Sony; 1990 / Marlene / Who Ring; 1991 / The Best Of The Best / CBS/Sony; 1991 / Unforgettable You / Who Ring; 1993 / We're All Alone / CBS/Sony; 1997 / Ipangako Sa Akin / Viva; 1994 / Stay With Me / Toshiba-EMI; 1998 / What's New / Ém Èm Gee; 2005 / Golden Best / GT; 2007 / Jazz'n Out / BMG; 2007 / Marlene meets Masato Honda B. B. Station / RCA; 2009 / Marlene Sings Nettai Jazz / RCA; 2011 / Initial / Sony; 2013 / Marlene Sings Donna Summer / Sony

Marlene with Threesome

- 2016 Cubic Magic (Sony)
- 2017 Whatever! (Sony)

Marlene as guest artist

- 1986 - Left Alone (Song) - Kyabare (Cabaret) Movie Soundtrack
