= Mathias Middelberg =

German politician

Mathias Middelberg MdB
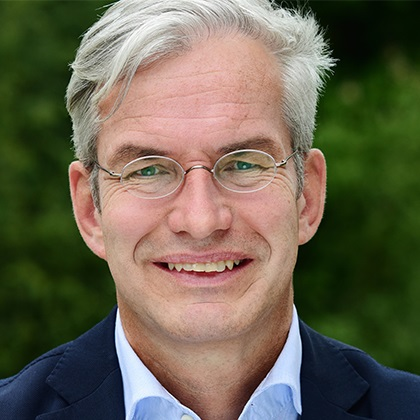
- Middelberg in 2016

Member of the Bundestag; from Lower Saxony
- Incumbent
- Assumed office 27 October 2009
- Preceded by: Martin Schwanholz
- Constituency: Stadt Osnabrück (2009–2021); State list (2021–2025); Stadt Osnabrück (2025–present)

Personal details
- Born: Mathias Wolfgang Antonius Middelberg; 14 December 1964 (age 61) Osnabrück, West Germany
- Party: Christian Democratic Union
- Education: University of Bonn; Speyer University

Mathias Wolfgang Antonius Middelberg (born 14 December 1964) is a German lawyer and politician of the Christian Democratic Union (CDU) who has been serving as a member of the Bundestag from the state of Lower Saxony since 2009.

== Early career ==
From 1997 until 2000, Middelberg served as chief of staff to the State Minister for Economic Affairs of Bremen, Josef Hattig.

== Political career ==
Middelberg first became a member of the Bundestag in the 2009 German federal election. He was a member of the Finance Committee before joining the Committee for Home Affairs from 2018 until 2021. He has since been serving as his parliamentary group's spokesperson on home affairs.

In the negotiations to form a coalition government under the leadership of Chancellor Angela Merkel following the 2017 federal elections, Middelberg was part of the working group on economic policy, led Thomas Strobl, Alexander Dobrindt and Brigitte Zypries.

In 2021 elections, he lost his constituency to Manuel Gava of the SPD, but was re-elected on the state list. Since then Middelberg has been serving as one his parliamentary group's deputy chairs, under the leadership of successive chairs Ralph Brinkhaus (2021–2022), Friedrich Merz (2022–2025) and Jens Spahn (2025–2026). In this capacity, he oversees the group's legislative activities on financial policy.

On behalf of his parliamentary group, Middelberg led negotiations with cabinet members Christian Lindner, Christine Lambrecht and Annalena Baerbock in May 2022 on securing a two-thirds majority in parliament needed to change Germany's constitution to allow for a credit-based special defense fund of 100 billion euros ($107.35 billion) proposed after Russia's invasion of Ukraine.

Following the 2025 national elections, incoming Chancellor Friedrich Merz asked Middelberg to serve as Minister of State for European Affairs at the Federal Foreign Office; however, Middelberg ultimately withdrew from consideration and the post went to Gunther Krichbaum.

== Other activities ==
- Memorial to the Murdered Jews of Europe Foundation, Member of the Board of Trustees
- New Synagogue of Berlin, Member of the Board of Trustees
- German Federal Environmental Foundation (DBU), Member of the Board of Trustees

== Political positions ==
In June 2017, Middelberg voted against his parliamentary group's majority and in favor of Germany's introduction of same-sex marriage.

== Personal life ==
Middelberg is unmarried.
