= Amazonas State =

Amazonas State may refer to:

- Amazonas State (Brazil)
- Amazonas State (Venezuela)

== See also ==
- Amazonas (disambiguation)
