= Amazonas Province =

Amazonas Province may refer to:

- Amazonas Province (Brazil), 1850–1889
- Amazonas Province (Venezuela), 1856–1860, one of the provinces of Venezuela

== See also ==
- Amazonas (disambiguation)
