= Amazons (Japanese group) =

Japanese female group

- Origin: Japan
- Genres: J-pop; R&B; soul
- Years active: 1985–1996; 2005–present
- Labels: CBS/Sony, For Life Music
- Members: Kumi Saito; Tomoko Yoshikawa; Yuko Ohtaki
- Website: amazons.tobiiro.jp

The Amazons are a Japanese female group, that consists of Kumi Saito, Tomoko Yoshikawa, and Yuko Ohtaki. The group was formed in 1985 and signed to CBS/Sony.

== History ==
In 1985, the Amazons formed as a background vocalists, first appearing on Marlene's Be Pop Live Tour. In 1986, they performed background vocals on Toshinobu Kubota's debut album Shake It Paradise. In 1987, they toured as the backup vocalists for his Keep on Dancing Tour in 1987. The Amazons also recorded a concert film with Kubota titled Keep on Dancing (1988). In November 1987, they released their debut single "Glorious Glamourous". In May 1988, they released their debut album Nisemono Tengoku. From 1989 to 1990, they hosted on their own radio show called Dance Dance Dance with Amazons on FM Nack5 79.5. In March 1990, they released their second album Some Like It Hot. The album spawned the singles: "Oh Darling", "Usonaki de Cheek", "Yume de Aimashō", and "Kiss in the Dark".

They released their album Idle Chatter in 1991, which became their final album on CBS/Sony. In May 1993, they released their fourth album Yane no Nai Restaurant on For Life Music. In October 1995, the group released their sixth studio album Divine Destiny before disbanding. Ohtaki and Saito continued working as backup vocalists for several singers, often touring together with the same music acts. In 2005, the group reformed to celebrate their twentieth anniversary. They recorded an album titled Amazons with Suga Shikao & The Family Sugar (2006). The group toured as Suga Shikao's backup vocalists for his Shikao & The Family Sugar Fan'Key Parade Tour in 2007. In May 2016, they released an extended play titled Fantastic 30. In March 2021, the Amazons embarked on their headlining concert tour Amazons 35th Anniversary Live Tour. In 2023, they toured as the background vocalists for Iyo Matsumoto's Live Journey Tour.

== Discography ==
Albums

- Nisemono Tengoku (1988)
- Some Like It Hot (1990)
- Idle Chatter (1991)
- Yane no Nai Restaurant (1993)
- 10 (1994)
- Divine Destiny (1995)
- Amazons with Suga Shikao & The Family Sugar (2006)

== Tours ==
Headlining

- Nisemono Tengoku Tour (1988)
- Fantastic30 Tour (2017)
- Amazons 35th Anniversary Live～A History Shared With Friends～(2021)

Background vocalists

- Be Pop Live Tour (Marlene) (1985)
- Keep on Dancing Tour (Toshinobu Kubota) (1987)
- Shikao & The Family Sugar Tour (Suga Shikao) (2000-2001)
- Shikao & The Family Sugar Fan'Key Parade Tour (Suga Shikao) (2007)
- Live Tour 2023 Journey (Iyo Matsumoto) (2023)
