= Amazonas Department =

Amazonas Department may refer to:

- Amazonas (Colombian department), the Colombian department of Amazonas
- Amazonas (Peruvian department), the Peruvian department of Amazonas
- Department of Amazonas (Peru–Bolivian Confederation), the department of Amazonas in the extinct Peru-Bolivian Confederation

== See also ==
- Amazonas (disambiguation)
