= Amyzon =

Amyzon may refer to:

- Amyzon (city), an ancient city in what is now Turkey
- Amyzon (fish), an extinct Paleogene fish genus from North America

== See also ==
- Amazon (disambiguation)
