= Shake It Paradise =

Studio album by Toshinobu Kubota
- Released: September 10, 1986
- Recorded: 1982–1986
- Genre: Pop, R&B
- Length: 47:02
- Label: Sony Music Entertainment Japan
- Producer: Hidenori Taga (exec. producer), Hiroshi Inagaki (exec. producer), Toshinobu Kubota, Hitoshi Ishitani, Tatsufumi Inaba

Toshinobu Kubota chronology
Shake It Paradise (1986)	Groovin' (1987)

Shake It Paradise is the first studio album of Japanese singer Toshinobu Kubota, released on September 10, 1986. Under the label, Kubota released his first single, "Shitsui no Downtown" in June 1986, followed by "Time" in December. Both songs were well received by radio, placing fifty-three and thirty-five on the Oricon Singles Chart. "Shake It Paradise" peaked at number twenty-two and remained on the Oricon Albums Chart for seven consecutive weeks. Shake It Paradise became certified platinum.

== Track listing ==
These are English tracklistings, then Japanese.

1. Ryuusei no Sadoru (流星のサドル, Saddle of meteor)
2. Olympic Wa Hi No Kuruma (オリンピックは火の車, Olympic is a fiery chariot)
3. Shake It Paradise
4. Missing
5. Shitsui no Downtown (失意のダウンタウン, Downtown Disappointment)
6. To The Party
7. Mou Hitori No Kimi O Nokoshite (もうひとりの君を残して, Leave you alone anymore)
8. Somebody Sorrow
9. Dedicate (TO M.E.)
10. Inside (Insideカーニバル, Inside Carnival)
11. For You (For You〜伝えきれなくて, For You (To Tell))

== Personnel ==
- Arranged By – Kubota Band (tracks: 3), 中村哲* (tracks: 5, 10), 武部聡志* (tracks: 1, 9), 杉山卓夫* (tracks: 2, 4, 6 to 8, 11)
- Arranged By [All Vocals & Chorus], Lead Vocals – Toshinobu Kubota
- Artwork By [Art Direction & Design] – Akio Nimbari
- Artwork By [Design] – Tomoaki Sakai
- Bass [Electric, Synthesizer] – Kitaro Nakamura
- Chorus – Kumi Saito (tracks: 3, 6, 8, 9), Tomoko Yoshikawa (tracks: 3, 6, 8, 9), Toshinobu Kubota, Yuko Otaki (tracks: 3, 6, 8, 9)
- Drums, Electronic Drums [Simmons] – Nobuo Eguchi
- Engineer [Assistant] – Masaru Arai, Michihide Nagashima, Shojiro Watanabe, Tetsuya Ikeda
- Engineer [Recording & Mixing] – Takashi Shimizu
- Engineer [Recording] – Akio Ikawa, Susumu Yamazaki, Teruaki Igarashi
- Executive Producer – Hidenori Taga, Hiroshi Inagaki
- Guitar [Electric] – Ichiro Hada, Yuji Toriyama (tracks: 1, 9)
- Lyrics By – 川村真澄* (tracks: 1, 5 to 8, 10, 11), 久保田利伸* (tracks: 2 to 4, 9)
- Mastered By [Re-mastered] – Doug Sax
- Music By – 羽田一郎* (tracks: 2, 3, 6, 10), 久保田利伸*
- Other [Assistant Director] – Nobuo Morinaga
- Other [Director] – Kazuyasu Honma
- Percussion – Makoto Kimura (tracks: 1, 9), Motoya Hamaguchi (tracks: 5, 10)
- Photography – Joji Ide
- Piano – Takao Sugiyama
- Producer – Hitoshi Ishitani, Tatsufumi Inaba
- Saxophone, Woodwind [Reed] – Satoshi Nakamura (tracks: 5, 10)
- Strings – Hiiro Group*
- Synthesizer – Satoshi Nakamura (tracks: 5, 10), Satoshi Takebe (tracks: 1, 9), Takao Sugiyama
- Technician [Operator] – Hironori Hoki* (tracks: 2 to 4, 6 to 8), Itaru Sakota (tracks: 5, 10), Tetsuo Otake* (tracks: 1, 9)

== See also ==
- 1986 in Japanese music
