= Seawind (band) =

American jazz fusion band

- Origin: Hawaii
- Genres: Jazz fusion; jazz funk; funk; soul jazz; disco; Christian pop
- Years active: 1974–1982, 2005–2009?
- Labels: CTI; Horizon; A&M; CBS/Sony
- Members: Pauline Wilson; Jerry Hey; Kim Hutchcroft; Ken Wild; Bud Nuañez; Larry Williams; Bob Wilson
- Website: seawindjazz.com

Seawind was an American jazz fusion band from Hawaii, consisting of lead singer Pauline Wilson, guitarist Bud Nuañez, bassist Ken Wild, drummer Bob Wilson, keyboardist, flutist and saxophonist Larry Williams, saxophone and flute player Kim Hutchcroft, and trumpeter Jerry Hey. Seawind recorded two albums for CTI Records, one for Horizon Records and one for A&M Records.

Seawind achieved a Grammy nomination in the category Best Arrangement Accompanying Vocalist(s) in 1978 for the song "The Devil Is a Liar".

== Background ==
A notable part of the band's sound was the Seawind Horns (trumpeter Jerry Hey, sax and flute player Kim Hutchcroft, and sax and flute player Larry Williams), who went on to provide backing instrumentals and horn arrangements for performers such as Earth, Wind & Fire, George Benson, Michael Jackson (Thriller, Off the Wall, and Bad), Quincy Jones and Mika. Hey left Seawind as a touring member in 1979 but continued as a recording member of the band through 1980. Trumpeter Larry Hall, an original member of the band when they were called "OX", rejoined the group in 2005. Hey and Hall are longtime friends and both are top-call recording session musicians.

The band released the single "Gotta Be Willing To Lose" under the band name Ox on Warped Records. To avoid possible legal issues with John Entwistle's band, which was called Ox as well, they decided to rename the band to Seawind. The first single under the band name Seawind "One Sweet Night" was released in 1977 on CTI records. When the act signed with A&M, they released in 1980 "The Two Of Us" as their second single, followed by the single "What Cha Doin'", which became a modest hit on Billboard's Disco/Dance Chart in November 1980, peaking at number 28.

In 1981, Bob and Pauline Wilson released a contemporary Christian music album, Somebody Loves You, which, although technically not a Seawind album, features the same trademark sound with the same musicians and vocalists. Seawind broke up in 1982, but reunited in 2005 for a Los Angeles concert performance and then began work on a new CD, which took them over three years to complete. After the breakup of Seawind in 1982, Pauline Wilson recorded three solo records which include contributions by some former Seawind members: Intuition in 1992, Only You in 1997, and Tribute in 2001. Pauline Wilson is the first vocalist from Hawaii to win a Grammy award (singing a duet with George Benson on the album In Harmony – A Sesame Street Record, which won the Grammy Award for Best Album for Children in 1980).

In 1995, a Seawind compilation CD, Remember, was released on Noteworthy Records. Remember includes five tracks recorded during sessions for their never-completed fifth album. Seawind's 2009 CD Reunion was released on Village Records, a subsidiary of Sony Music Entertainment Japan.

== Discography ==
=== Studio albums ===
Title	Album details	Peak chart positions	
Title	Album details	US	US R&B
Seawind	Released: 1976; Label: CTI Records	—	—
Window of a Child	Released: 1977; Label: CTI Records	122	55
Light the Light	Released: 1979; Label: Horizon Records	143	—
Seawind	Released: 1980; Label: A&M Records	83	20
Reunion	Released: July 7, 2009; Label: Village Records	—	—
"—" denotes a recording that did not chart or was not released in that territory.

=== Compilation albums ===
- Remember (Noteworthy, 1995) – features 5 unreleased tracks from 1981

=== Singles ===
- unknown year - "Gotte be Willing To Lose" under the band name "Ox"
- 1976 – "Make Up Your Mind"
- 1977 – "One Sweet Night"
- 1979 – "Hold On to Love" (#70 R&B)
- 1980 – "What Cha Doin'" (#18 R&B, #28 Dance)
- 1980 – "The Two of Us"

=== The Seawind Horns as sidemen/guest artist ===
- 1978 The Jacksons, Destiny
- 1979 Michael Jackson, Off The Wall
- 1982 Marlene, Summer Nights with Seawind horns
- 1982 Michael Jackson, Thriller
- 1987 Michael Jackson, Bad
- 1992 Pauline Wilson, Intuition
- 1997 Pauline Wilson, Only You
- 2001 Pauline Wilson, Tribute
