= The Amazonia Conference =

Climate change activism organization

- Motto: Education for Preservation
- Established: February 1990
- Location: International

The Amazonia Conference is a global warming activist organization with a particular focus on education of the public.

The Conference was established in April 1992, when governments of the world were discussing the dangers of global warming at the Earth Summit in Rio de Janeiro in 1992. The Conference is an educational organisation with the aim of educating people about the endangered natural environment and what the group believes to be inevitable catastrophic consequences if no proactive and preventive steps are taken.
