= Connie Francis Sings Songs from Her New MGM Motion Picture "Looking for Love" =

Studio album by Connie Francis
- Released: 1965
- Label: MGM

Connie Francis Sings Songs from Her New MGM Motion Picture "Looking for Love", or simply Looking for Love, is an album by American singer Connie Francis, released in 1964 by MGM Records.

== Reception ==
Professional ratings
Review scores
Source	Rating
AllMusic	2/5 stars
Billboard	(favorable)

Billboard picked the album for its "Spotlight" review section as one with "sufficient sales potential", noting: "MGM has launched an all-out promotional drive on the film and the LP [...]. Wherether one sees the flick or not, the name of Connie Francis is enough to evoke plenty of sales."

== Track listing ==
LP (MGM E-4229 – mono, SE-4229 – stereo)

Side 1
No.	Title	Length
1.	"Looking for Love" (Rock'n'Roll Version)	2:01
2.	"Whoever You Are I Love You" (Vocal)	2:33
3.	"When the Clock Strikes Midnight"	2:24
4.	"Rock Dem Bells"	2:17
5.	"This Is My Happiest Moment"	1:59
6.	"Be My Love"	3:23

Side 2
No.	Title	Length
1.	"Looking for Love" (Jazz Version)	2:27
2.	"Let's Have a Party"	2:11
3.	"I Can't Believe That You're in Love with Me"	2:26
4.	"Connie Francis—Lady Valet Theme"	2:17
5.	"Whoever You Are I Love You" (Inst.)	1:12
6.	"Looking for Love" (Reprise)	0:54

== Charts ==
Chart (1964)	Peak position
US Billboard 200	122
