= Amazonas =

Amazonas may refer to:

== Places ==
- Amazon River, known as Amazonas in Spanish and Portuguese
- Amazonas (Brazilian state), Brazil
- Amazonas (Colombian department), Colombia
- Amazonas (Peruvian department), Peru
- Amazonas (Venezuelan state), Venezuela

== Other uses ==
- Amazonas Futebol Clube, an association football (soccer) club from Manaus, Brazil
- Amazonas (film), or Massacre in Dinosaur Valley, a 1985 Italian-Brazilian cannibal film
- Amazonas, a Brazilian frigate-type warship launched in 1851 and decommissioned in 1897

== See also ==
- Amazon (disambiguation)
- Amazon basin
- Amazon rainforest
- Amazonas Province (disambiguation)
- Amazonas State (disambiguation)
- Amazonas Department (disambiguation)
