= Wallenhorst =

- Municipality
- Coat of arms

- Location of Wallenhorst within Osnabrück district
- Interactive map of Wallenhorst
- Location within Germany Location within Lower Saxony
- Coordinates: 52°21′N 8°1′E
- Country: Germany
- State: Lower Saxony
- District: Osnabrück
- Subdivisions: 4 districts

Government
  - Mayor (2026–31): Michael Lührmann (CDU)

Area
  - Total: 47.17 km^{2} (18.21 sq mi)
- Elevation: 88 m (289 ft)

Population (2025-12-31)
  - Total: 22,591
  - Density: 478.9/km^{2} (1,240/sq mi)
- Time zone: UTC+01:00 (CET)
  - Summer (DST): UTC+02:00 (CEST)
- Postal codes: 49134
- Dialling codes: 05407
- Vehicle registration: OS, BSB, MEL, WTL
- Website: www.wallenhorst.de

Wallenhorst (German pronunciation: [ˈvalənhɔʁst]) is a municipality in the district of Osnabrück, in Lower Saxony, Germany. It is situated in the Wiehengebirge, approx. 10 km north of Osnabrück.

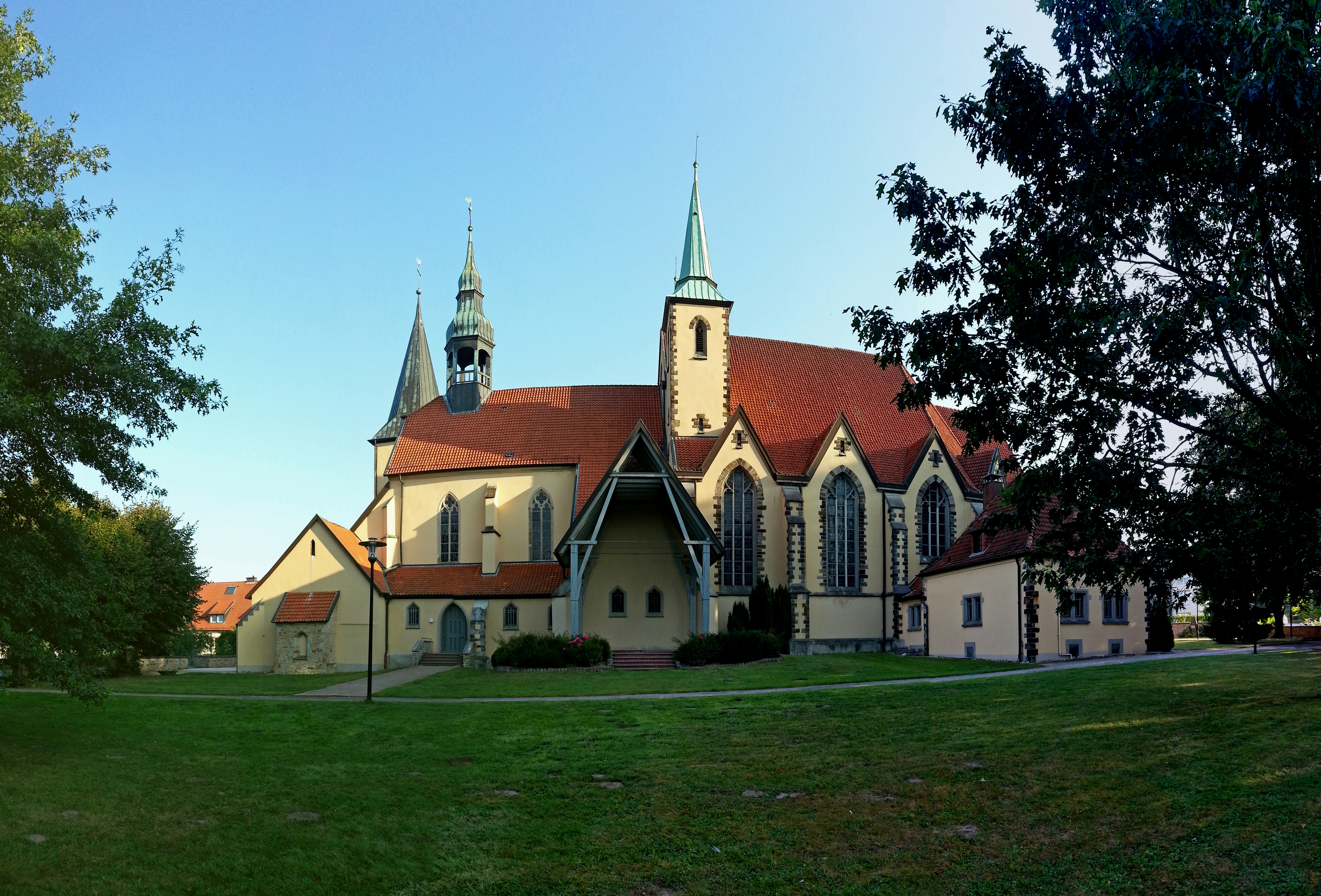
Johannes church in Rulle district

The New St. Alexander Church serves as a reference height for all other heights in the German Mean Height Reference System (Normalhöhennull).

== Notable people ==
- Georg Budke (1900–1994), politician CDU
- Hubert Müller (1936–1995), Catholic priest, theologian and church lawyer
- Johanna Voß (born 1957), politician (The Left)

=== Other personalities ===
- Clemens Lammerskitten (born 1957), politician CDU
- Stefan Niggemeier (born 1969), media journalist, grew up in the Wallenhorster districts of Rulle and Lechtingen
- Horst Georg Pöhlmann (born 1933), German evangelical theologian, lives in Wallenhorst
- Irmgard Vogelsang (born 1946), politician CDU
