= RMS Amazon =

RMS Amazon may refer to one of the following Royal Mail Ships of the Royal Mail Steam Packet Company or Royal Mail Lines:

- RMS Amazon (1851), an RMSP wooden paddle steamer that burned and sank on her maiden voyage in January 1852, killing 104 people
- RMS Amazon (1906), an RMSP ocean liner sunk by SM U-110 on 15 March 1918.
- RMS Amazon (1959), an RML ocean liner transferred to Shaw, Savill Line in 1968 and later converted into the car transporter ship Akarita.
