= Hasbergen =

- Municipality
- Coat of arms

- Location of Hasbergen within Osnabrück district
- Interactive map of Hasbergen
- Location within Germany Location within Lower Saxony
- Coordinates: 52°13′N 07°55′E
- Country: Germany
- State: Lower Saxony
- District: Osnabrück
- Subdivisions: 3

Government
  - Mayor (2021–26): Adrian Schäfer (SPD)

Area
  - Total: 21.72 km^{2} (8.39 sq mi)
- Elevation: 62–228 m (203–748 ft)

Population (2025-12-31)
  - Total: 10,878
  - Density: 500.8/km^{2} (1,297/sq mi)
- Time zone: UTC+01:00 (CET)
  - Summer (DST): UTC+02:00 (CEST)
- Postal codes: 49205
- Dialling codes: 05405
- Vehicle registration: OS, BSB, MEL, WTL
- Website: www.hasbergen.de

Hasbergen (German pronunciation: [ˈhasˌbɛʁɡn̩]) is a municipality in the district of Osnabrück, in Lower Saxony, Germany. It is situated in the Teutoburg Forest, approx. 7 km west of Osnabrück. Hasbergen consists of Hasbergen proper, Gaste and Ohrbeck.

The municipality lies partly in the Hüggel hills, that belongs to the Teutoburg Forest Protected Area. The hills range from 62 to 228 metres above sea level (NN). In Hasbergen is the 108-metre-high Rote Berg.
