= Joi Cardwell discography =

Artist discography

- Studio albums: 8
- EPs: 2
- Compilation albums: 5
- Singles: 57

American singer and songwriter Joi Cardwell has released eight studio albums, five compilation albums, two EPs, and 57 singles (including 10 as a featured artist).

Joi Cardwell released her debut album The World Is Full of Trouble in the United States in May 1995. The album's lead single, "Trouble", reached number eleven on the Billboard Dance Club Songs. Her self-titled second album was released in November 1997, and was their breakthrough release. The first-two singles, "Soul to Bare" and "Run to You", peaked in the top-two positions with the latter peaking atop the US Billboard Dance chart. The follow-up album, Deliverance, featured a more urban sound that was released on her own recording label No-Mad Industries in 1999.

The fourth album, The Plain Jane Project, was released in the fall of 2005. The album spawned the top-ten singles "Freedom" and "It's Over". She released her fifth album Wanderlust (The Soundtrack) in 2009, followed by Must Be the Music in 2011. In September 2014, Cardwell released her seventh album The Art of Being on her new recording label Curly Gurly Records.

== Albums ==
=== Studio albums ===
List of studio albums
Title	Album details
The World Is Full of Trouble	Released: May 15, 1995; Label: Eightball; Format: CD, LP, digital download
Joi Cardwell	Released: November 11, 1997; Label: Eightball; Format: CD, LP, digital download
Deliverance	Released: April 4, 1999; Label: No-Mad Industries; Format: CD, digital download
The Plain Jane Project	Released: November 18, 2005; Label: No-Mad Industries; Format: CD, digital download
Wanderlust (The Soundtrack)	Released: April 7, 2009; Label: No-Mad Industries; Format: CD, digital download
Must Be the Music	Released: March 19, 2011; Label: No-Mad Industries; Format: CD, digital download
The Art of Being	Released: September 2, 2014; Label: Curly Gurly; Format: CD, digital download
Pride and Joi	Released: June 1, 2018; Label: Curly Gurly; Format: CD, digital download

=== Compilation albums ===
List of compilation albums
Title	Album details
Clubland's Greatest Hits	Released: November 10, 1998; Label: Cold Front Records; Format: CD, cassette
More (1992-2003)	Released: September 2003; Label: No-Mad Industries; Format: CD, digital download
Hits and More	Released: 2004; Label: No-Mad Industries; Format: CD, digital download
A Beautiful Life	Released: May 7, 2007; Label: Rambling Records, Geneon Entertainment; Format: CD, digital download

== Extended plays ==
List of EPs
Title	Details
Eight Ball EP	Released: March 23, 1998; Label: Eightball; Format: Vinyl
Left Field Adventures	Released: June 2, 2015; Label: Curly Gurly; Format: Digital download

== Singles ==
=== As lead artist ===
List of singles as lead artist, with selected chart positions and certifications, showing year released and album name
Title	Year	Peak chart positions		Album
Title	Year	US Dance	UK	Album
"Goodbye"	1992	—	—	Non-album single
"Trouble"	1994	11	—	The World Is Full of Trouble
"Jump for Joi"	1995	2	—	The World Is Full of Trouble
"Love & Devotion"	1995	3	—	The World Is Full of Trouble
"My First Christmas With You"	1995	11	—	Non-album single
"You Got to Pray"	1996	1	—	The World Is Full of Trouble
"Soul to Bare"	1997	2	95	Joi Cardwell
"Run to You"	1997	1	—	Joi Cardwell
"Found Love"	1998	5	—	Joi Cardwell
"Power"	1998	8	—	Joi Cardwell
"Last Chance for Love"	1999	17	—	Deliverance
"Superstar"	2000	—	—	Deliverance
"Jump for Joi (2000 version)"	2000	7	—	Non-album single
"After the Rain"	2003	—	—	More (1992–2003)
"If You're Ever Lonely"	2003	—	—	More (1992–2003)
"Mind Control" (with Fred Jorio)	2004	20	—	Non-album single
"Freedom"	2004	7	—	The Plain Jane Project
"It's Over"	2006	4	—	The Plain Jane Project
"What It Feels Like"	2006	30	—	The Plain Jane Project
"Make It Alright" (featuring Lenny Fontana)	2006	—	—	Non-album single
"Keep Coming Around" (featuring Mona Lisa)	2007	—	—	Non-album single
"Believe in Us"	2007	4	—	Non-album single
"A Beautiful Life"	2007	—	—	A Beautiful Life
"Be Yourself"	2007	—	—	A Beautiful Life
"Imperfect"	2007	—	—	Wanderlust (The Soundtrack)
"Happy"	2008	—	—	Wanderlust (The Soundtrack)
"People Make the World Go Round"	2008	—	—	Wanderlust (The Soundtrack)
"Come Together"	2008	—	—	Wanderlust (The Soundtrack)
"Change the World"	2008	—	—	Wanderlust (The Soundtrack)
"What's Freedom"	2010	—	—	Wanderlust (The Soundtrack)
"All Night"	2010	—	—	Must Be the Music
"We Got the Night"	2010	—	—	Must Be the Music
"How Deep Is Your Love?"	2011	—	—	Must Be the Music
"Only You"	2011	—	—	Must Be the Music
"Return to Love"	2012	—	—	The Art of Being
"Music Saved My Life"	2013	—	—	The Art of Being
"Indian Giver"	2014	—	—	The Art of Being
"Jump 4 Joi (DJ Mike Cruz Mix)"	2014	—	—	The Art of Being
"Lucky Charm"	2014	—	—	The Art of Being
"Shot Through the Heart"	2014	—	—	The Art of Being
"Feels Like Heaven"	2015	—	—	The Art of Being
"Wasn't It You (Alaia & Gallo Mix)"	2015	—	—	Non-album single
"What Love's Gonna Do"	2016	—	—	Non-album single
"We Can Do Better"	2017	—	—	Non-album single
"Days of Our Lives"	2017	—	—	Non-album single
"Magic"	2017	—	—	Non-album single
"Trouble 2018"	2018	—	—	Non-album single
"Best of Me"	2018	—	—	Non-album single
"—" denotes items which were not released in that country or failed to chart.

=== As featured artist ===
List of singles as lead artist, with selected chart positions and certifications, showing year released and album name
Title	Year	Peak chart positions			Album
Title	Year	US Dance	US Dan. Airplay	UK	Album
"Club Lonely" (Lil Louis & the World featuring Joi Cardwell)	1992	1	1	—	Journey with the Lonely
"Saved My Life" (Lil Louis & the World featuring Joi Cardwell)	1992	1	1	74	Journey with the Lonely
"Holdin' On" (Urban Renewal featuring Joi Cardwell)	1994	—	—	—	Non-album single
"Luv Connection" (Towa Tei featuring Joi Cardwell)	1995	—	—	—	Future Listening!
"The Creator Has a Master Plan" (Brooklyn Funk Essentials with Joi Cardwell)	1995	—	—	—	Cool and Steady and Easy
"Let It Go" (Soul Brothers featuring Joi Cardwell)	2010	—	—	—	Non-album single
"I'm Lost" (George Morel featuring Joi Cardwell)	2013	—	—	—	Non-album single
"Bright Eyes" (Namy featuring Joi Cardwell)	2015	—	—	—	Non-album single
"Dance or Die" (Brooklyn Funk Essentials with Joi Cardwell)	2015	—	—	—	Funk Ain't Ova
"Gabriel" (Brooklyn Funk Essentials with Joi Cardwell)	2015	—	—	—	Funk Ain't Ova
"—" denotes items which were not released in that country or failed to chart.

== Album appearances ==
Song	Year	Artist(s)	Album
"Brittany"	1989	Lil Louis & the World (featuring Joi Cardwell)	From the Mind of Lil Louis
"Club Lonely"	1992	Lil Louis & the World (featuring Joi Cardwell)	Journey with the Lonely
"Saved My Life"	1992	Lil Louis & the World (featuring Joi Cardwell)	Journey with the Lonely
"Dancing in My Sleep"	1992	Lil Louis & the World (featuring Joi Cardwell)	Journey with the Lonely
"The Creator Has a Master Plan"	1995	Brooklyn Funk Essentials (featuring Joi Cardwell)	Cool and Steady and Easy
"Too Light 2 Do"	1995	Toshinobu Kubota (featuring Joi Cardwell)	Bumpin' Voyage
"As One"	2000	Toshinobu Kubota (featuring Joi Cardwell)	As One
"Keep Hope Alive"	2004	Underground Dance Artists United for Life (Blaze, Joi Cardwell, Arnold Jarvis, Barbara Tucker, Byron Stingily, Charlotte Small, Dawn Tallman, Kenny Bobien, Michelle Weeks and Ultra Naté)	Keep Hope Alive
"Be Yourself"	2004	Joi Cardwell	Keep Hope Alive
"Dance or Die"	2013	Brooklyn Funk Essentials (featuring Joi Cardwell)	Funk Ain't Ova
"Gabriel"	2013	Brooklyn Funk Essentials (featuring Joi Cardwell)	Funk Ain't Ova
