= Eight-ball (disambiguation) =

Eight-ball is a pool game played with a numbered solids-and-stripes ball set.

Eight-ball, 8-ball, or variants may also refer to:

== Games and toys ==
- Eight-ball pool (British variation), also known as "eightball pool" or "blackball" depending on governing body, a primarily British and Commonwealth-countries game played with an unnumbered reds-and-yellows ball set
- 8 ball, the black ball, marked 8, used in pool games like eight-ball and blackball
- Magic 8 Ball, a toy that resembles the pool ball and provides advice, predictions, or answers to yes/no questions

== Music ==
- 8 Ball Aitken (born 1981), Australian musician
- 8Ball & MJG, an American hip hop duo
- 8 Ball, an EP by the Burden Brothers, 2002
- Eight Ball, an EP by Joi Cardwell, 1998
- "8 Ball", a song by Underworld
- "8-Ball", a song by Pop Smoke from the album Faith, 2021
- "Eight Ball", a song by N.W.A. from N.W.A. and the Posse
- Eightball Records, an American record label

== Intoxicants ==
- "8-ball", slang for one-eighth ounce (3.5 g) of a powdered psychoactive drug (typically cocaine, but also heroin, ketamine, or methamphetamine)
- 8-Ball, slang for Olde English 800 brand malt liquor

== Other uses ==
- 8-Ball (comics), a Marvel Comics supervillain and his successors
- Eightball (comics), a Daniel Clowes comic book
- Eight Ball (film), a 1992 Australian film
- 8-pallo, a 2013 Finnish film also known by its English-language name 8-ball
- 8-ball, a variety of zucchini
- 8-ball, an eight-dimensional n-ball in mathematics
- 8-Ball, a ring name used by Ronald Harris of the Harris Brothers
- 8-Ball, a character from the fourth season of Battle for Dream Island, an animated web series
- 8-ball, a symbol used in the modern fashion industry, most notably in the streetwear fashion brand, Stüssy
- The nickname of NASA Astronaut Group 21
- Eight-Ball, a 1977 pinball machine by Bally and the second best-selling pinball machine of all time.

== See also ==
- Eight Ball Deluxe, a Bally pinball machine
- Eight Ball Deluxe (video game), 1993 video game based on the pinball machine of the same name
- Behind the eight ball (disambiguation)
