= Must Be the Music (disambiguation) =

Must Be the Music is a British television musical talent competition.

Must Be the Music may also refer to:

- Must Be the Music (film), a 1996 short film by Nickolas Perry
- Must Be the Music (Polish TV series), a musical talent competition
- Must Be the Music, a 2011 album by Joi Cardwell
- "Must Be the Music", a 1999 song by Joey Negro
- "Must Be the Music", a 2008 song by Mýa from Sugar & Spice
- "Must Be the Music", a 1982 song by Secret Weapon
