= Dhafer Youssef =

Dhafer Youssef ظافر يوسف
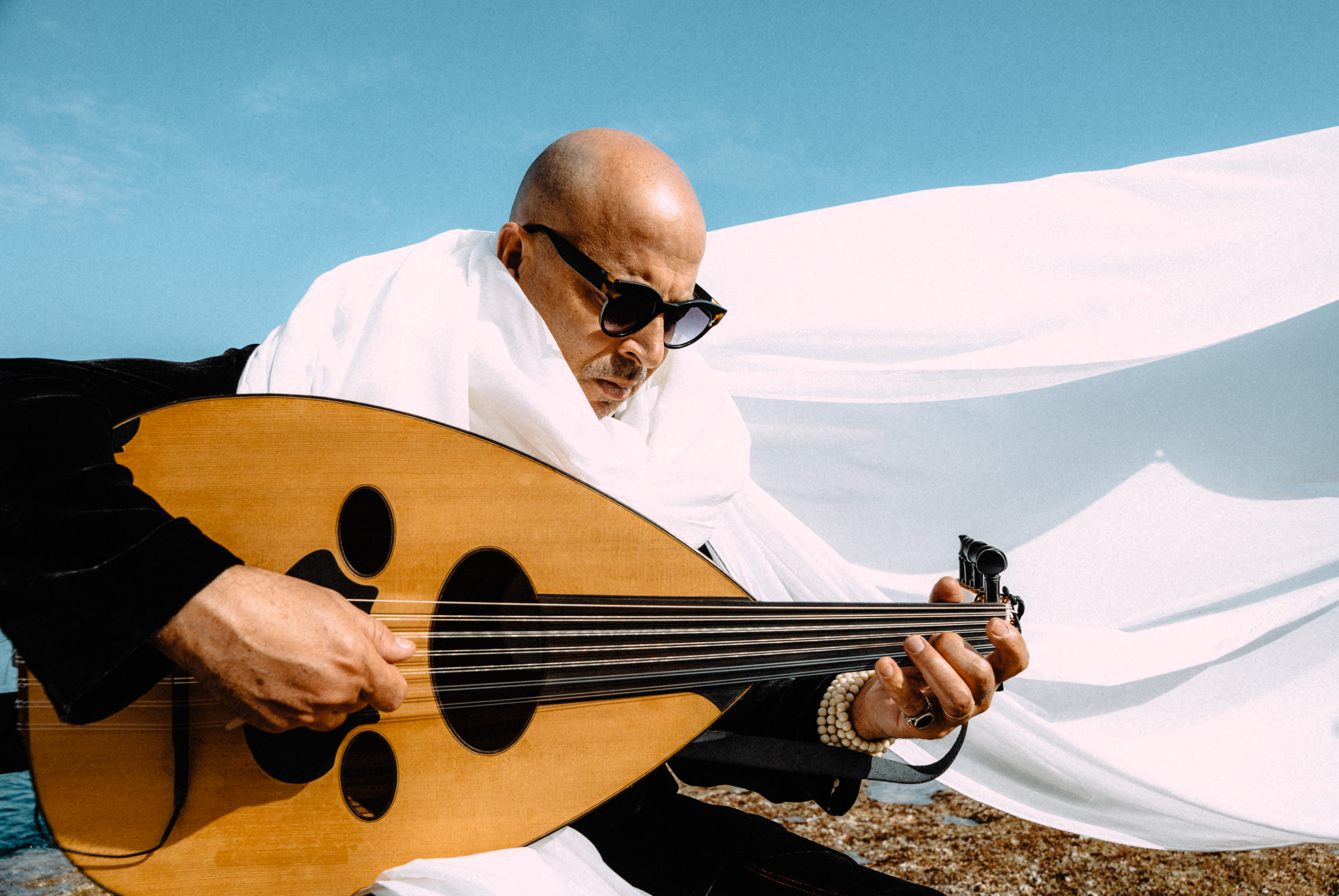
- Dhafer Youssef, Tunisia, 2023

Background information
- Born: Dhafer bin Youssef bin Tahar Maarref; 19 November 1967 (age 58); Teboulba, Tunisia
- Origin: Tunisia
- Genres: Ethno jazz, world fusion, Sufi, qawwali, jazz fusion, new-age, jazztronica
- Occupations: Musician, singer
- Instruments: Oud, vocals
- Years active: 1990–present
- Labels: Enja, Justin Time, Jazzland, EmArcy, Okeh, Back Beat Edition
- Website: www.dhaferyoussef.com

Dhafer Youssef (Arabic: ظافر يوسف; born 19 November 1967) is a Tunisian composer, singer and oud player.

== Biography ==
Dhafer Youssef was born in Téboulba (a small village of coastal Tunisia); his grandfather was a muezzin. He calls the radio "the most important school" for him.

He developed an interest in jazz at an early age and clandestinely listened to it during his education at a Qur'anic school. He later left Tunisia to start a jazz career and has lived in Europe since 1990, usually in Paris or Vienna. He also works in avant-garde and world music where he has been nominated for awards.

He has released ten albums of his own and created notable work with Sardinian trumpeter Paolo Fresu and the Norwegian guitarist Eivind Aarset.

He has an affinity for the music of India and Nordic music.

He was a guest artist on the Norwegian jazz artist Bugge Wesseltoft's album FiLM iNG.

Dhafer Youssef built his reputation with his performances. There he combines vocal and instrumental improvisation that create a profound spiritual connection with the attendees.

He has performed with Ustad Zakir Hussain, Jon Hassell, Uri Caine, Tigran Hamasyan, Markus Stockhausen, Nguyên Lê, Omar Sosa and Hüsnü Şenlendirici. Youssef is one of the ambassadors to Music Traveler, together with Billy Joel, Hans Zimmer, John Malkovich, Sean Lennon, Adrien Brody and more. In 2001, he recorded Electric Sufi with the ex-Sugar Hill Gang and Tackhead rhythm section of Will Calhoun and Doug Wimbish.

In 2015, Youssef opened the Sligo Jazz project with a quartet act at the Hawk's Well Theatre at Connacht, Ireland.

Youssef released Diwan of Beauty and Odd in 2016, which was praised by critics.

Dhafer Youssef released "Sounds of Mirrors" in 2018 with the participation of Zakir Hussain on tabla, Hüsnü Şenlendirici on the clarinet and Eivind Aarset on the guitar.

The earliest recordings for Street of Minarets were made at Sunset Sound Recorders in Los Angeles, with the participation of Herbie Hancock, Marcus Miller, Dave Holland, Vinnie Colaiuta, and Ambrose Akinmusire, but the album was reworked a decade later with the participation of Rakesh Chaurasia, Nguyên Lê and others before being released in 2023.

== Discography ==
=== Solo albums ===
- 1999: Malak (Enja)
- 2001: Electric Sufi (Enja)
- 2003: Digital Prophecy (Justin Time)
- 2006: Divine Shadows (Jazzland)
- 2010: Abu Nawas Rhapsody (EmArcy)
- 2013: Birds Requiem (Okeh) (FR: #191)
- 2016: Diwan of Beauty and Odd (Okeh) (FR: #82)
- 2018: Sounds of Mirrors (Anteprima) (FR:#128)
- 2023: Street of Minarets (Back Beat Edition)
- 2025: Shiraz (ACT)

=== Collaborations ===
- 1997: Blue Planet – Peace for Kabul (Blue Flame World Music), with Lenny MacDowell and Hakim Ludin
- 1998: hot ROOM (Extraplatte), also featuring Otto Lechner, Wolfgang Puschnig, Achim Tang
- 2003: Exile (Enja), with Gilad Atzmon & The Orient House Ensemble feat. Reem Kelani & Dhafer Youssef
- 2005: Odem (with Wolfgang Puschnig and Jatinder Thakur) (EmArcy), with Wolfgang Puschnig and Jatinder Thakur
- 2006: Homescape (ACT), with Nguyên Lê Duos Paolo Fresu
- 2007: Glow (Material), with Wolfgang Muthspiel
- 2008: Jo & Co (Universal Music Polska), with Anna Maria Jopek feat. Richard Bona and Mino Cinelu
- 2008: Latitudini – Omaggio Alla World Music (Casa Del Jazz), with Paolo Fresu and Eivind Aarset
- 2017: Luna (Original Motion Picture Soundtrack) with Iain Ballamy And Dave McKean Featuring Dhafer Youssef, Emilia Mårtensson With Stian Carstensen, Stuart Hall, Matthew Sharp (Feral Records)
