= The Plain Jane Project =

Studio album by Joi Cardwell
- Released: November 18, 2005
- Recorded: 2003–2005
- Genre: R&B; house; pop
- Length: 68:44
- Label: No-Mad Industries
- Producer: Joi Cardwell (also exec.)

Joi Cardwell chronology
Hits and More (2004)	The Plain Jane Project (2005)	A Beautiful Life (2007)

Joi Cardwell studio album chronology
Deliverance (1999)	The Plain Jane Project (2005)	Wanderlust (The Soundtrack) (2009)

Singles from The Plain Jane Project
- 1. "Freedom" Released: July 19, 2004; 2. "What It Feels Like" Released: May 1, 2006; 3. "It's Over" Released: May 9, 2006

The Plain Jane Project (sometimes stylized as The Plane Jane Project) is the fourth studio album by American singer Joi Cardwell. It was released on November 18, 2005, by Cardwell's independent recording label No-Mad Industries.

== Overview ==
In 2003, Cardwell began working on the album. On July 19, 2004, Cardwell released "Freedom" as the lead single. The song peaked at number seven on Billboard's Dance Club Songs chart. On November 18, 2005, Cardwell released The Plain Jane Project on her record label No-Mad Industries, making this her second studio album (fourth overall album) to be released on the record label. Physical copies of the album were exclusively distributed through Starbucks, which Cardwell partnered with to help distribute her album.

In May 2006, Cardwell released two singles; "What It Feels Like" and "It's Over". A version of "It's Over" that was remixed by DJ Mike Cruz was released and peaked at number four on the Dance Club Songs' chart. To further support the album, Cardwell performed at the Starbucks Salon Concert in New York on September 15, 2006.

The opening song "Be Yourself" appeared on the Underground Dance Artists United For Life: Keep Hope Alive album in 2004 as part of the Keep Hope Alive Project to benefit LIFEbeat, the music industry AIDS-awareness organization. The song would later be released as a single in 2007.

== Track listing ==
All tracks are written by Joi Cardwell.

No.	Title	Length
1.	"Be Yourself"	6:05
2.	"What It Feels Like"	4:59
3.	"What Kind of Fool"	5:42
4.	"I Got You"	3:58
5.	"Let It Ride"	6:01
6.	"Change Your Mind"	4:06
7.	"Sweet Memories"	4:35
8.	"Misunderstood"	4:22
9.	"Freedom (Glidescope Mix)"	6:39
10.	"Give It Up (Guitar Mix)"	7:44
11.	"Love is the Answer"	6:08
12.	"It's Over (featuring Georgie Porgie)"	8:25
