= Joseph Shannon =

Joseph Shannon or Joe Shannon may refer to:

- Joe Shannon (politician) (1867–1943), U.S. Representative from Missouri
- Joseph A. Shannon (1859–1934), architect in Devils Lake, North Dakota
- Joe Shannon (baseball) (1897–1955), Major League Baseball player
- Joe Shannon (artist) (born 1933), Puerto Rican artist
- Joe Shannon (chef) (1964–2024), Irish chef
