= 300 (pinball) =

1975 pinball machine

- Manufacturer: Gottlieb
- Release date: August 1975 ("300"); October 1975 (Top Score)
- System: Electro-mechanical
- Design: Ed Krynski
- Artwork: Gordon Morison
- Production run: 8,157 ("300"); 3,304 (Top Score)

"300" (the exact machine name includes the quotation marks) is a bowling themed Electro-Mechanical pinball machine with the art created by Gordon Morison, designed by Ed Krynski, and produced by Gottlieb with a bowling theme. The title is a reference to a perfect game in the bowling, in which a bowler scores 300 points. A two-player version of this four-player game was released as Top Score.

== Description ==
Gottlieb sold this game design in the two variations, although they are essentially the same game (with slight artwork differences). The two-player version, Top Score, had a lower price and was released later than the four-player "300", and was targeted to game operators with a smaller budget. This game used animated backbox red (bowling) balls for the bonus unit. Two kickout holes, two pop bumpers, one spinning target, one slingshots, 4 standup targets, 1 rollover, and two 3-inch flippers. It has the same right side lane scoring as Gottlieb Sheriff pinball (1971), and similar left side score as Gottlieb Super Soccer. Only a couple Gottlieb pinball games made during the 1970s used a backbox animation. The game has the same mechanical backbox animation as Super Soccer pinball.
