= Hanifah Walidah =

American performing artist and writer

- Also known as: Shä-Key, Mizz Walidah
- Born: New York
- Genres: Hip-hop, spoken word
- Occupations: Rapper, singer, poet, actress
- Instrument: Voice

Hanifah Walidah is an American poet, rapper, singer, actor, playwright, educator and LGBT activist. Throughout her career, she has collaborated with artists like The Vibe Khameleons, Brooklyn Funk Essentials, Alexkid, Mike Ladd, St.Lo, and Antipop Consortium.

== Biography ==
Walidah was born in New York City and raised in Yonkers. At the start of her career, she joined the group Brooklyn Funk Essentials during the 1990s under the stage name Shä-Key. In 1994, Shä-Key released her debut album, A Head Nädda's Journey To Adidi Skizm (produced by Earl Blaize), mixing experimental hip-hop, soul and beatbox (featuring Rahzel who became a member of The Roots).

In 2004, her one-woman play, Black Folks' Guide to Queer Folks: Your Neighborhood Inside Out, about homophobia in the black community, opened Boston's Out on the Edge, an LGBT theatre festival. A review in the Boston Globe described it as a "virtual master class in just how witty and moving theater can be".

In 2005, the song "Pick It Up" (performed by Alexkid and composed by Stefane Goldman, Alexis Mauri and Hanifah Walidah) was included in the compilation 24 Hours in Paris. In 2007, she joined the French electro group St-Lô.

In 2009, she co-directed an incidental documentary titled U People during the filming of the music video for the song "Make a Move". The 'rockumentary' explores ethnicity, race, and gender in black queer women's communities. It won the Audience Award for Best Documentary at the Paris International Lesbian and Feminist Film Festival in 2009 and was nominated for a GLAAD Media Award for Outstanding Documentary in 2010. It became the first LGBT film to be screened at the National Civil Rights Museum in Memphis in 2009, "a real highlight" for Walidah.

In 2012, her group St-Lô performed at the TransMusicales Festival. Stéphane Davet of the newspaper Le Monde wrote, "The beautiful story of a trio from Lorient crossing paths with the poet and singer from New York, Hanifah Walidah (...) Between the roughness of blues, the spirit of politicized rap, and the depth of soul, Miss Walidah's singing shines all the more as her energy as a performer radiates the stage". At the end of 2012, the group released its first album, Room 415, which was well received by critics.

Walidah has called herself an "androgynous female", asking to be called "Mizz" Walidah, depending on her mood. She is featured in the documentary film Black/Womyn: Conversations with Lesbians of African Descent (2008), directed by Tiona McClodden.

== Discography ==
- A Head Nädda's Journey to Adidi Skizm
- Adidi – The Unrocked Story (with Earl Blaize)
- Once Upon It Is
- Room 415 (with St.Lo)
