= Joe Shannon (chef) =

Irish chef (1965–2024)

- Shannon in 2021
- Born: 24 April 1965; Coventry, UK
- Died: 4 March 2024 (aged 58); County Sligo, Ireland
- Education: Killybegs Catering College
- Occupations: Chef, television personality, radio presenter
- Spouse: Marie Shannon
- Children: Orla, Emer, Joseph
- Website: chefjoeshannon.ie

Joe Shannon (24 April 1965 – 4 March 2024) was an Irish chef and television personality.

== Early life and career ==
Joe Shannon was born in Coventry, UK before moving to Ireland at the age of 8 years. Shannon graduated from the Killybegs Catering College. He was the executive chef at Radisson Blu Hotel in County Sligo, where he secured many accolades including multiple AA Rossette awards for The Brasserie and the Mount Cadet Sunday Lunch Awards. Shannon was a founding member of the North West branch of the Panel of Chefs of Ireland and served on the panel's National Executive Council.

As a public figure, Shannon appeared regularly on Ireland AM, and co-hosted a midday radio show called Joe and Georgie Unplugged on Ocean FM. He also co-founded the popular Facebook page, The Recovery Tour, to help and provide solace to others navigating their own personal challenges.

Shannon also appeared on stage singing at the Hawk's Well Theatre and in pantomimes. He appeared on Ireland AM for 18 years and was renowned for his hearty laugh, positive outlook and for his ability to speak openly about his illness in latter years. Shannon last appeared on Ireland AM in November 2023.

== Illness and death ==
Shannon was first diagnosed with bowel cancer following emergency surgery in March 2021 and began chemotherapy shortly thereafter. Doctors found a further tumour on his liver in June of the same year resulting in another surgery and continued chemotherapy. In April 2022, Shannon's scan results showed no evidence of disease but his cancer relapsed in 2023, with a terminal diagnosis in May 2023. Joe Shannon succumbed to metastatic colon cancer at the North West Hospice, Co. Sligo on 4 March 2024. Shannon was married to Marie and had three children.

Shannon's funeral took place at Rathcormack Church, Co. Sligo on 8 March 2024.
