= Georgie Porgie (producer) =

American house music producer and musician

Georgie Porgie is the stage name used by the American house music producer and musician, George N. Andros, from Chicago, Illinois. He first had an entry on the US Billboard Hot Dance Club Play chart in 1994, and reached #1 for the first time in 2002 with "Love's Gonna Save the Day," a song that was written in response to the 9/11 terrorist attacks. In 2003, his song "I Love I Love" also hit #1 on the US dance chart, a third dance #1 came in 2005 with "Sunshine." In the UK Singles Chart he has had three entries with "Everybody Must Party" (1995), "Take Me Higher" (1996), and "Life Goes On" (2000).

He joined with Joi Cardwell for the duet, "It's Over", in the fall of 2006. In December 2006, he performed at the Long Island Kids in Action conference in Farmingdale, New York, where he performed his single "Sunshine." The release, "I Believe" became his fourth chart-topper in 2007. "Can You Feel That Sound" became his fifth U.S. dance chart topper in late 2008.

== See also ==
- List of number-one dance hits (United States)
- List of artists who reached number one on the US Dance chart
