= 2001 (pinball) =

1971 pinball machine

- Manufacturer: Gottlieb
- Release date: January 1971
- System: Electro-mechanical
- Design: Ed Krynski
- Artwork: Gordon Morison
- Production run: 2,200

2001 is a pinball machine designed by Ed Krynski and produced by Gottlieb in 1971.

== Layout and Gameplay ==
At the top of the playfield the game has a series of five kick-out holes. Below these are two pop bumpers, and a target at each side. There are twenty along the sides of the machine arranged in four banks: red, blue, green, and yellow. Four further bulls-eye targets are towards the middle of the machine. The game has simple rules, after knocking down all drop-targets of a color the corresponding rollover near the bottom of the machine and the corresponding kick-out hole increase in value; if the player hits all twenty drop-targets the centre kick-out hole increases in value.

== Design ==
Unlike drop targets on most earlier machines which use a solenoid for each target, each target bank of five targets uses two solenoids to control them.

Along with variants of this game called Dimension and Galaxie, this is the first pinball machine to use multiple banks of drop-targets.
