= Ed Krynski =

Pinball game designer (1927–2004)

- Born: Edward Paul Krynski; September 12, 1927
- Died: November 15, 2004 (aged 77)
- Resting place: Clarendon Hills Cemetery; Darien, Illinois, U.S. 41.7630997°N 87.9831009°W
- Occupation: Pinball designer
- Years active: 1959–1984
- Employer: Gottlieb
- Children: 4 (including 2 adopted)

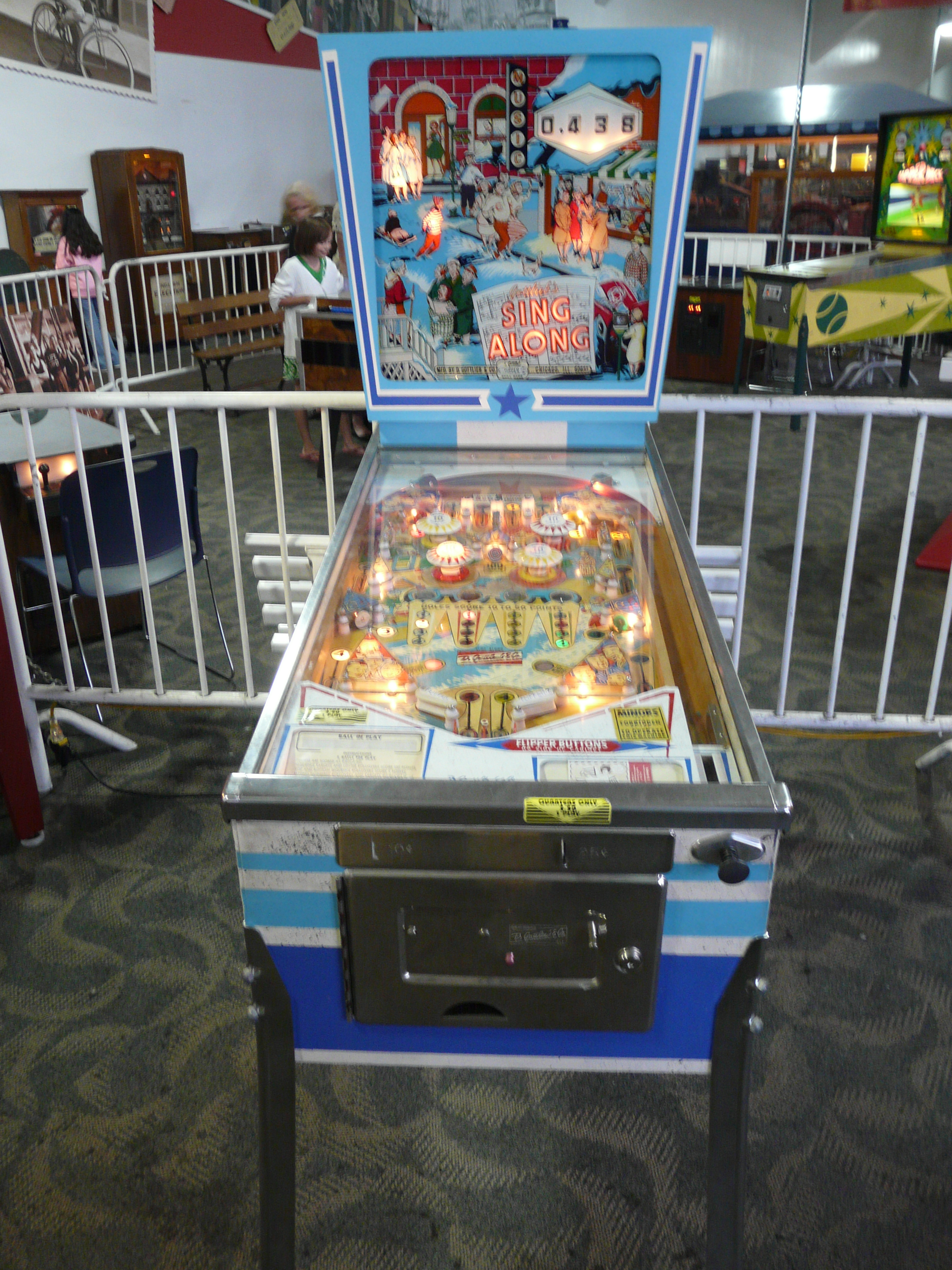
Sing Along pinball machine, designed by Krynski

Edward Paul Krynski (September 12, 1927 – November 15, 2004) was a pinball game designer and innovator who worked for D. Gottlieb & Co between 1965 and 1984. During this time Krynski designed more than 200 games and innovated new pinball standards such as the laneways to the flipper, carousel targets, vari-targets, multiple drop targets, and the first solid state pinball machine with the speaker in the backbox instead of the bottom cabinet. Krynski is a member of the Pinball Hall of Fame.

The first pinball machine designed by Krynski was Hi Straight, released in December 1959 by Keeney. While at Keeney he also designed gambling machines. Shortly after joining Gottlieb in 1963, long-term designer Wayne Neyens was promoted from lead designer to chief engineer, and Krynski took over the role of lead designer. The last pinball machine he designed was El Dorado City of Gold, released in September 1984 by Gottlieb.

The Internet Pinball Machine Database identifies 225 machines designed by Krynski, including "300", 2001, 4 Square, The Amazing Spider-Man, El Dorado City of Gold, Genie, Spirit of 76, Central Park, Royal Flush, Big Shot, and Sing Along.

Unlike many other pinball designers he only played games he designed during the process of building and testing them, not subsequently for fun.

Stan Lee, the co-creator of Spider-Man and public face of Marvel Comics, claimed ownership of one of Krynski's first The Amazing Spider-Man pinball machines off the assembly line in 1980 and kept it in his Marvel office until he auctioned it as part of his "Stan Lee collection". Lee said that "Over the years, I have spent countless frustrating yet perversely enjoyable hours attempting to play on it, as have numerous colleagues, friends and business associates (some quite famous, though a combination of modesty, shame and my legendary bad memory prevents me from divulging their names here) during their unrelenting pilgrimages to my office. In fact, I think many of these scions of arts and industry came over JUST to beat me up at pinball. I hope its new owner will be a better player than I am."

Krynski served in the United States Navy during World War II.

== Sources ==
- The Pinball Compendium by Michael Shalhoub ISBN 0-7643-2300-8
