= Deliverance (Joi Cardwell album) =

Studio album by Joi Cardwell
- Released: April 4, 1999
- Recorded: 1998
- Genre: R&B
- Length: 56:06
- Label: No-Mad Industries
- Producer: Joi Cardwell (also exec.)

Joi Cardwell chronology
Clubland's Greatest Hits (1998)	Deliverance (1999)	More (1992–2003) (2003)

Joi Cardwell studio album chronology
Joi Cardwell (1997)	Deliverance (1999)	The Plain Jane Project (2005)

Singles from Deliverance
- 1. "Last Chance for Love" Released: April 8, 1999; 2. "Superstar" Released: 2000

Deliverance is the third studio album by American singer Joi Cardwell. It was released on April 4, 1999, by Cardwell's independent recording label No-Mad Industries. The album contains slow and midtempo pop and R&B ballads.

== Recording and production ==
After the conclusion of her tour in 1997, Cardwell began working on her third album which she would self-produce. She worked with her previous collaborator James Preston who played keyboards on two songs; "Sunshine" and "Love Lost". She also worked with recording engineer Konrad Carelli, who worked with Cardwell on her previous album, Joi Cardwell.

== Release and promotion ==
Following her departure from Eightball Records, Cardwell decided to start her own recording label called No-Mad Industries. She also secured a distribution deal with WEA's Sumthing Distribution to distribute Deliverance. The album was released on April 4, 1999, in North America. The album was only distributed through in compact disc format as opposed to her previous albums, which were distributed in many other musical formats.

"Last Chance for Love", self-produced by Cardwell, was released on April 8, 1999, as the album's lead single. The song peaked at number 17 on Billboard's Hot Dance Music/Club Play. The song won Best Dance Song at the GLAMA Awards in 2000.

The album's second single "Superstar", a hip hop-infused cover version of Delaney and Bonnie's song, was released on 2000. The song remains the only track on the album that was not written by Cardwell. A remix maxi-single was released which featured six different versions of the song.

== Critical reception ==
The song "Last Chance for Love" received positive feedback from many critics. This Week in Texas magazine praised the song, stating: "The original mix is quite delicious all on its own." Michael Paoletta of Billboard magazine compared Deliverance to album releases by D'Angelo and Maxwell. Paoletta commented that "Like those two artists, Cardwell a singer/songwriter aware of R&B's past, and more important, aware of its future."

== Track listing ==
No.	Title	Writer(s)	Length
1.	"Sunshine"	Joi Cardwell	4:00
2.	"Get Down" (featuring Lin Que Ayoung)	Cardwell, Lin Que Ayoung	4:24
3.	"Deliverance"	Cardwell	4:40
4.	"Superstar"	Bonnie Bramlett, Leon Russell	3:55
5.	"Be My Baby"	Cardwell	6:57
6.	"Give It Up"	Cardwell	4:08
7.	"Come Go with Me"	Cardwell	3:55
8.	"Love Someone"	Cardwell	4:33
9.	"Love Lost"	Cardwell	5:35
10.	"Last Chance for Love"	Cardwell	4:32
11.	"Last Chance for Love" (Remix)	Cardwell	9:27

== Personnel ==
- Joi Cardwell – lead vocals (all tracks), backing vocals (tracks 1–11), producer, executive producer, songwriting (1–11)
- Jenny Acheson – graphic artist
- Lin Que Ayoung – lead vocals (track 2)
- Konrad Carelli – audio engineer
- James 'Sleepy Keys' Preston – keyboards
- E. Smith – audio engineer
