= Big Shot (pinball) =

1974 pinball machine

- Manufacturer: Gottlieb
- Release date: January 1974
- System: Electro-Mechanical
- Players: 2
- Design: Ed Krynski
- Artwork: Gordon Morison
- Production run: 2,900

Big Shot is a pinball machine designed by Ed Krynski and produced by Gottlieb in 1974. It was created as a two-player version of their 1973 game, Hot Shot. The table has a pool theme. 2,900 units were manufactured.

== Game Play ==
The goal of the game is to light all 15 billiard ball lights. The player must hit the ball drop targets on either side of a central bumper to light its corresponding ball light, except the 8 ball. The 8 ball is lit by either going through the middle gate or by stopping in the center pit. When stopped in the center pit, a diverter (also called a gate) will change position, allowing a ball drained in the right outlane to return to the plunger lane. Once all the ball lights are lit, the special can be achieved by hitting the target on the special lit side. The light switches sides when the slingshots are hit. Replays can be achieved by hitting the special lit side and by earning 50,000 points, 64,000 points, and 72,000 points.

== Digital versions ==
This game is included in the Pinball Hall of Fame: The Gottlieb Collection for the Nintendo GameCube, Xbox, Wii, PlayStation 2, and PlayStation Portable.

Big Shot was released by the same developer for The Pinball Arcade on several platforms.

== See also ==
- Cue Ball Wizard - a cue sports themed pinball machine by Gottlieb
- Eight Ball Deluxe - a cue sports themed pinball machine by Bally
