= Joi Cardwell (album) =

Studio album by Joi Cardwell
- Released: November 11, 1997
- Recorded: 1996–1997
- Genre: House; R&B
- Length: 60:17
- Label: Eightball
- Producer: Joi Cardwell (exec.); Alex Kaplan (also exec.); Dave Carlucci; DJ Mike Cruz; Phillip Damien; Dahoud Darien; John Debo; Brinsley Evans; Gomi; Hani Al-Bader; Frankie Knuckles

Joi Cardwell chronology
The World Is Full of Trouble (1995)	Joi Cardwell (1997)	Clubland's Greatest Hits (1998)

Joi Cardwell studio album chronology
The World Is Full of Trouble (1995)	Joi Cardwell (1997)	Deliverance (1999)

Singles from Joi Cardwell
- 1. "Soul to Bare" Released: February 3, 1997; 2. "Run to You" Released: November 25, 1997; 3. "Found Love" Released: October 12, 1998; 4. "Power" Released: November 23, 1998

Joi Cardwell is the second studio album by American singer Joi Cardwell. It was released on November 11, 1997, by Eightball Records in collaboration with WEA's Lightyear Entertainment. Most of the lyrical content of the album was inspired by Cardwell's personal life.

Upon its release, Joi Cardwell received generally positive reviews from most music critics. It was also successful in international music markets and yielded four singles, including four commercial hits: "Soul to Bare", "Run to You", "Found Love" and "Power".

== Recording and production ==
Cardwell began her second album in mid-1996. The album was at four different recording studios in New York City including Big Screen Studios, Fusion Studios, Num Sound Studios, and Gomi's Lair Productions. Cardwell decided to enlist in recording and writing with more producers and taking a slightly lesser production than she did on her debut album. Producers Phillip Damien, Hani Al-Bader, Bluejean, Frankie Knuckles, Brinsley Evans each contributed tracks and mixes, while Cardwell also self-produced several songs. The songs were mastered and engineered by Konrad Carelli and Gerald Freeman in New York City.

Joi Cardwell was influenced by a variety of American genres, and, like Cardwell's previous album, incorporated urban contemporary elements including contemporary R&B and jazz. Cardwell crafted most songs on the album through live instrumentation and diverse techniques. This is evident on "Stop & Think", which utilizes bass guitar, drums, keyboard, and different percussion instruments.

== Release and promotion ==
After the success of her previous album, Eightball Records decided to partner with WEA's Lightyear Entertainment to distribute Joi Cardwell. The album was released on November 11, 1997, in North America. Cardwell, who had toured throughout the year of 1997, decided to briefly conclude the tour to cope with the untimely death of her mother Jacqueline Cardwell; who died of metastatic breast cancer.

"Soul to Bare", produced in collaboration with Hani Al-Bader, was released on February 3, 1997, as the album's lead single. The song peaked in the top-two on Billboard's Hot Dance Music/Club Play. "Run to You" was released on November 25. It became her second solo highest-charting single, opening at number forty-four on the Billboard Club Play chart; ultimately peaking at number 1 for two weeks.

The album's third single "Found Love" was released on October 12, 1998, as the third single. Produced by Frankie Knuckles, the song was described as more romantic in comparison to her previous single releases. "Found Love" peaked at number five on the Club Play chart. "Power", the album's final single, was released on November 23, 1998. Along with the release of each single, remix EPs were released.

== Critical reception ==
Joi Cardwell received generally positive reviews from music critics. Paul Verna of Billboard magazine gave a nod to Cardwell by saying, "As the set's dominant producer and songwriter, Cardwell scores equally high marks in both roles." AllMusic gave the album three out of five stars. Barry Walters of The Advocate highlights the album's tone and timbre as particularly emotional and honest in lyrical content, stating "Cardwell refines the rawness of her debut while maintaining its emotional honesty. Joi Cardwell is much more lush and club-ready."

== Track listing ==
No.	Title	Writer(s)	Producer(s)	Length
1.	"Run to You"	Joi Cardwell; Phillip Damien	Damien	4:26
2.	"Soul to Bare"	Cardwell; Hani Al-Bader	Al-Bader	3:31
3.	"Crying Eyes"	Cardwell	Cardwell; Bluejeans	4:06
4.	"Stop & Think"	Cardwell	Cardwell	4:29
5.	"Found Love"	Cardwell; Frankie Knuckles	Knuckles	6:29
6.	"Wet"	Cardwell	Cardwell	4:11
7.	"Run to You (Dahoud's R&B Mix)"	Cardwell; Damien	Damien	3:59
8.	"Power"	Cardwell; Brinsley Evans	Cardwell; Evans	6:20
9.	"Turn Back Time (M.C.D.C.'s Album Version)"	Cardwell; David Carlucci; DJ Mike Cruz	Carlucci; Cruz	4:16
10.	"You Got to Pray (Gomi's Lair X-Beat Vocal Edit)"	Cardwell; Willy Washington; DJ Mike Cruz	Cardwell; Gomi	7:49
11.	"Soul to Bare (Hex Hector's Mix)"	Cardwell; Al-Bader	Al-Bader; Hex Hector	6:27
12.	"Power (Brinsley's R&B Version)"	Cardwell	Cardwell; Evans	4:23
Total length:				60:17

== Personnel ==
- Joi Cardwell – lead vocals (All tracks), backing vocals (tracks 1–12), producer, executive producer, songwriting (1–12)
- Hani Al-Bader – producer, programming, engineer, co-writer
- Sandy Barber – background vocals
- Bluejean – producer, engineer
- Atelier³ D Thom Bissett – graphic artist
- Konrad Carelli – engineer
- David Carlucci – producer
- Patrick Carvajal – mixer
- Mayra Casalas – percussion
- Fred Cash – bass
- Jon Creamer – drums
- DJ Mike Cruz – producer
- Phillip Damien – producer
- Dahoud Darien – producer
- Yancy Drew – drums
- Gerald Freeman – engineer
- Lee Genesis – background vocals
- Kazuhiko Gomi – programming, producer
- Richie Goods – bass
- Hex Hector – producer (track 11)
- Matthias Heilbronn – engineer
- Stephanie James – background vocals
- Alex Kaplan – executive producer
- Frankie Knuckles – producer, mixer, songwriter
- Dah Len – photography
- Danny Madden – vocal production
- Marina Maaricic – Hair & Makeup
- Shedrick Mitchell – organ
- Cindy Mizelle – background vocals
- Laurie Padilla – background vocals
- James 'Sleepy Keys' Preston – piano
- Peter Schwartz – keyboards, songwriting
- E. Smoove – vocal production
- Dave "EQ" Sussman – engineer
- Satoshi Tomiie – programming
- Willy Washington – songwriting
- Audrey Wheeler – background vocals
- Kevin Williams – A&R
