= Behind the eight ball =

Behind the eight ball may refer to:

- "Behind the eight ball" (idiom), an idiomatic expression meaning in a difficult situation
- Behind the Eight Ball, a 1942–1956 series of short comedy films with Joe McDoakes
- "Behind the Eight Ball", a 1942 song in You Don't Know What Love Is, a musical from Universal Pictures
- Behind the Eight Ball (film), a 1942 American comedy film
- "Behind the Eight Ball", a 1947 song by Johnny Tyler
- Behind the 8 Ball, a 1964 album by US organist Baby Face Willette
- "Behind the Eight Ball", a 1991 episode of the television comedy series Top of the Heap
- Behind the 8 ball, a 2004 album by Australian musician 8 Ball Aitken

== See also ==
- Eight-ball (disambiguation)
