= The World Is Full of Trouble =

Studio album by Joi Cardwell
- Released: May 15, 1995
- Recorded: 1994
- Genre: House; R&B
- Length: 42:20
- Label: Eightball
- Producer: Joi Cardwell (exec.); Alex Kaplan (also exec.); Kevin Williams (also exec.); James Preston; George Morel; Darrin Friedman; Hex Hector

Joi Cardwell chronology
The World Is Full of Trouble (1995)	Joi Cardwell (1997)

Singles from The World Is Full of Trouble
- 1. "Trouble" Released: January 20, 1994; 2. "Jump for Joi" Released: February 11, 1995; 3. "Love & Devotion" Released: June 17, 1995; 4. "You Got to Pray" Released: July 15, 1996

The World Is Full of Trouble is the debut studio album by American singer Joi Cardwell. It was released on May 15, 1995, by Eightball Records. Recording sessions for the album took place from 1993 to 1994 at several studios, after the climax of her then-group The Promise. As executive producer of the album, Cardwell took a wider role in its production, co-writing a majority of the songs, choosing which ones to produce and sharing ideas on the mixing and mastering of tracks.

The tracks in the album are a mixture of uptempos and ballads, which are basically inspired by house and R&B genres; it also features elements of pop and jazz. The World Is Full of Trouble received positive reviews from music critics upon its release, with critics praising Cardwell's "artistic leap".

== Recording ==
Cardwell began recording the album in 1993. In 1994, she signed to Eightball Records who would later distribute her music. Eightball paired her with a singer James Preston, who took on the role of co-writing and co-producing several of the songs on the album. Cardwell went to House Of Music in West Orange, New Jersey to record a few song, among them was the song "Jump for Joi". She recorded the rest of the album at Eightball Records' own studio in New York City. Unlike the album with her former girl-group The Promise, Cardwell took a major role in the production of The World Is Full of Trouble, writing and producing a majority of the songs, choosing which ones to produce and sharing ideas on the mixing and mastering of tracks. With 9 songs completed, Cardwell was credited as songwriter and co-producer, as well as the album's executive producer alongside Eightball Records' A&R Kevin Williams and CEO Alex Kaplan. The World Is Full of Trouble are originally part of the lyrics to her song "Trouble", which Cardwell co-wrote. The song was released as the lead single for the album with a shorter song title in 1994.

== Music and lyrics ==
Songs in the album are varied: from mid-tempo and club-oriented tracks in the first half, and ballads in the second half. Although the album contains high-energy songs like "Trouble" and "Jump for Joi", the album's focal mode, however, is slow and moody. The album incorporates traditional jazz, funk, and blues influences. Cardwell was also applauded for her lyrical content. Larry Flick of Billboard commented, "Cardwell's clever way with words results in penetrating message of hope, while also locking in a tight, infectious hook." Cardwell commented, "Lyrics have to be meaningful and memorable enough that people will insist on keeping the vocals on the tracks."

== Release and promotion ==
The album was released on May 15, 1995, by Eightball Records who also distributed the album worldwide. The album was released in compact disc, LP, and limited-edition 12-inch vinyl formats. In mid-1995, Cardwell toured with Brooklyn Funk Essentials, a band whom she had recorded and released a single with called "The Creator Has A Master Plan". In December 1995, Cardwell headlined her own concert tour called "My First Christmas With You Tour" in Japan. At the kickoff of the tour, Cardwell also released a special edition of her album, which included four additional songs. After the conclusion of the tour in early 1996, Cardwell remained in Japan and toured with Toshinobu Kubota on his Oyeees! Tour. On July 17, 1996, Cardwell hosted The Billboard Dance Music Summit. She also performed several of the songs from the album, along with a few cover songs much to great reviews.

== Singles ==
In 1994, Cardwell premiered her debut single "Trouble" at the Billboard Dance Music Summit, which received positive feedback from major record label executives. The song became the Eightball Records' first charting single, which peaked at number 11 on Billboard's Dance chart. "Jump for Joi" was released as the second single in February 1995. It peaked in the top two in the United States.

"Love & Devotion" was released as the album's third single in June 1995. It received generally positive response, being considered more sultry than her previous two singles. It reached the top ten in the United States. "You Got to Pray" was the fourth single from the album, released in July 1996. The song was lauded by critics, who cited that it showcases Cardwell's most fluid and colorful song as of 1996. It became her first number one hit without a collaboration.

== Critical reception ==
The World Is Full of Trouble received generally positive reviews from music critics. Larry Flicker of Billboard magazine called the album "Clubland's greatest export to pop music years." AllMusic gave the album three out of five stars.

== Track listing ==
The World Is Full of Trouble – Standard edition
No.	Title	Writer(s)	Producer(s)	Length
1.	"Jump for Joi"	Joi Cardwell; James Preston	Cardwell	4:36
2.	"Love & Devotion"	Cardwell; Preston	Cardwell	5:21
3.	"Without You"	Cardwell	Cardwell	3:37
4.	"Land of Good and Plenty"	Cardwell	Cardwell	4:30
5.	"Killing Time"	Cardwell	Cardwell	4:08
6.	"Frère Jacques"	Cardwell	Cardwell	3:45
7.	"Keep It Real"	Cardwell; Preston	Cardwell; Preston	5:11
8.	"You Got to Pray"	Cardwell; Willy Washington	Cardwell	4:00
9.	"Trouble"	Cardwell; Preston	Cardwell	7:24
Total length:				42:20

The World Is Full of Trouble – Japanese edition
No.	Title	Writer(s)	Producer(s)	Length
10.	"Soul Survivor"	Cardwell	Cardwell	4:16
11.	"Two Different Worlds"	Cardwell	Cardwell	5:15
12.	"Jump for Joi (Spike Vocal Mix)"	Cardwell; Preston	Darrin Friedman; Hex Hector; Kazuhiko Gomi	9:40
13.	"Trouble (Satoshi's Def Vocal Mix)"	Cardwell; Preston	Satoshi Tomiie	8:39
Total length:				69:27

== Personnel ==
- Joi Cardwell – lead vocals (All tracks), backing vocals (tracks 1–13), producer (tracks 1–11), executive producer, songwriting (1–11)
- Jenny Acheson – photography
- Fernando Carvalhosa – graphic artist
- Fred Cash – bass
- James Castillo – additional recording engineer
- Joeham Eric – drums
- Darrin Friedman – producer (track 12)
- Kazuhiko Gomi – programming, producer (track 12)
- Louie "Balo" Guzman – programming
- Hex Hector – producer (track 12)
- Jon Kevin Jones – guitar
- Alex Kaplan – executive producer
- James 'Sleepy Keys' Preston – piano
- Warren Riker – mixing (tracks 1–8, 10, 11)
- Howie Robbins – keyboard
- Satoshi Tomiie – producer (track 13)
- Kevin Williams – executive producer
- Jodie Zalewski – additional recording engineer
