= At the Hawk's Well =

Play by William Butler Yeats

- Written by: William Butler Yeats

Premiere
- Date: 1916

At the Hawk's Well is a one-act play by William Butler Yeats, first performed in 1916 and published in 1917. It is one of five plays by Yeats which are loosely based on the stories of Cuchulain the mythological hero of ancient Ulster. It was the first English-language play heavily influenced by Japanese Noh Theatre.

== Dramatic form ==
The play is stylised, abstract, symbolic, and ritualistic, unlike its more realistic and plot-driven contemporaries. The stage is "any bare space before a wall against which stands a patterned screen", and the only props are a black cloth with "a gold pattern suggesting a hawk", and a blue cloth to represent a well. The actors' costumes are simple, striking and stylised, and the two main protagonists wear masks while the others have their faces made up to resemble masks. The puppet-like movement of the actors is accompanied throughout by a drum, gong, and zither.

The play is written in verse and opens and closes with the comments and interpretations of the musicians who speak both individually, and as a chorus. The bulk of the play features only the interactions between the three protagonists.

== Characters ==
- Three Musicians
- The Guardian of the Well
- An Old Man
- A Young Man

== Synopsis ==
The play is set by a dried up well on a desolate mountainside which is guarded by a hawk-like woman. An old man has kept camp there for fifty years, waiting to drink the miraculous waters from the well which occasionally rise up. Cuchulain arrives at the spot, having heard a story that the waters bring immortality. The Old Man urges Cuchulain to leave the well, telling of his wasted lifetime there and how, even when the waters did rise up, he was thwarted by a sudden urge to sleep. But Cuchulain is determined to stay and convinced that he shall soon drink the waters. While they speak of a hawk which had attacked Cuchulain earlier in the day, and which the old man claims is a supernatural being which carries a curse of discontent and violence, the Guardian of the Well seems to fall into a trance, arises, and begins to dance with hawk-like motions. She then leaves the stage as the well waters bubble up. Cuchulain pursues her, but unable to find her he returns to the well to be informed by the Old Man he has missed the waters. Oblivious, he rushes out again to face the warrior women the Guardian of the Well has called out to battle, ignoring the Old Man's pleas to stay with him.

== Themes ==
- Choice in relation to identity
- Fate and destiny
- Age and youth
- Natural and supernatural/physical and spiritual/mortality and immortality
- Psychological obstacles, conflict, and insight
- Rationality and impulse
- Heroic nature
- Conflict, change and transformation

== Miscellaneous ==
The Hawk's Well Theatre in Sligo, built in 1982 is named after the play.

The Japanese Author Yukio Mishima translated this play into Japanese.
