= The Amazing Spider-Man (pinball) =

1980 pinball machine

- Manufacturer: Gottlieb
- Release date: May 1980
- System: System 80
- Model #: 653
- Players: 1-4
- Design: Ed Krynski
- Artwork: Gordon Morison
- Licensor: Marvel Comics
- Production run: 7,625

The Amazing Spider-Man is a pinball game designed by Ed Krynski and released in 1980 by Gottlieb. It is based on the comic book character Spider-Man released by Marvel Comics.

== Description ==
The machine, designed by Ed Krynski with art by Gordon Morison, was produced by D. Gottlieb & Co. as the first in their Star Series 80 line. The first machine came off the assembly line in May 1980.

The Amazing Spider-Man was the first of Gottlieb's System 80 series of pinball machines and was the second Marvel character licensed by Gottlieb to be represented in a pinball machine (the first being Hulk).

The pinball machine featured character poses taken directly from Marvel Comics and style guides including Aunt May, Kingpin, Lizard, Scorpion, Vulture, Black Widow, Kraven the Hunter and the Green Goblin.

== Features ==
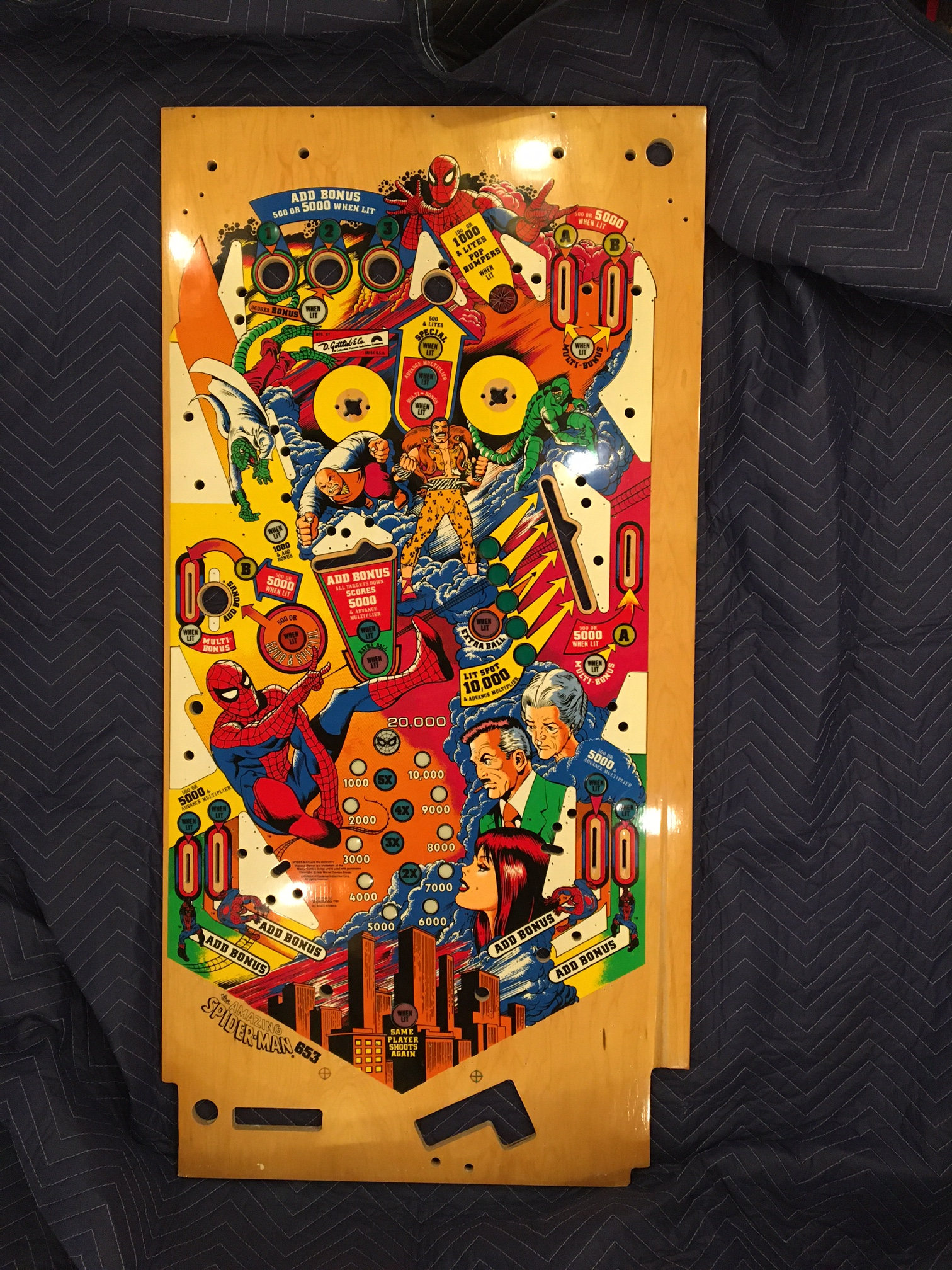
Unused playfield for the Gottlieb Spider-Man pinball machine.

The features;

- Special 24-inch (60cm) wide-bodied cabinet
- 4-Player game
- 4 6-Digit Vacuum fluorescent displays
- 4 Flippers (No Center Post)
- 1 Lane (with Spinner)
- 4 Exit Lanes
- 2 Slingshot Bumpers
- 3 Kick-Out Holes
- 2 Pop Bumpers
- 2 Spot Targets
- 2 Drop Target Banks (3 and 5 targets)

== Production ==
A total of 7,625 machines were produced and are currently sought-after collector's items.

It was the first of Gottlieb's System 80 design pinball machines. It also was the first Gottlieb pinball, with an "attract mode" lighting. In which various playfield lights, alternate between off an on, to make the game more attractive to passerbye, thus encouraging play. It was also the first solid state pinball with the speaker in the backbox (head) instead of the bottom cabinet.

Stan Lee, the co-creator of "Spider-Man" and public face of Marvel Comics, claimed ownership of one of the first machines off the assembly line and kept it in his Marvel office until he auctioned it as part of his "Stan Lee collection" at Heritage Comics Auctions of Dallas, Texas. Lee said that "Over the years, I have spent countless frustrating yet perversely enjoyable hours attempting to play on it, as have numerous colleagues, friends and business associates (some quite famous, though a combination of modesty, shame and my legendary bad memory prevents me from divulging their names here) during their unrelenting pilgrimages to my office. In fact, I think many of these scions of arts and industry came over JUST to beat me up at pinball. I hope its new owner will be a better player than I am."
