= Sligo Jazz Project =

Sligo Jazz Project is an international jazz summer school and festival which takes place in Sligo every July.

Sligo Jazz Project was formed in 2005 by a group of local musicians: Eddie Lee, Jim Meehan, Eddie McFarlane, and Felip Carbonell. Their vision was to bring world-class musicians to Sligo to teach and perform, with musical events that were non-elitist and affordable to everyone. Its events take place at Sligo's Hawk’s Well Theater.

Its first summer event ran in 2006, with Rufus Reid taking part. Since then the summer school, which takes place at ATU Sligo, has grown to become the biggest and most inclusive in Europe.

Artists who have taken part in the Festival in recent years include UK composer Nikki Iles (Artist-in-Residence, 2022), Christine Tobin, Tony Kofi, Lauren Kinsella, and many others.
