= Hüsnü Şenlendirici =

Turkish musician (born 1976)

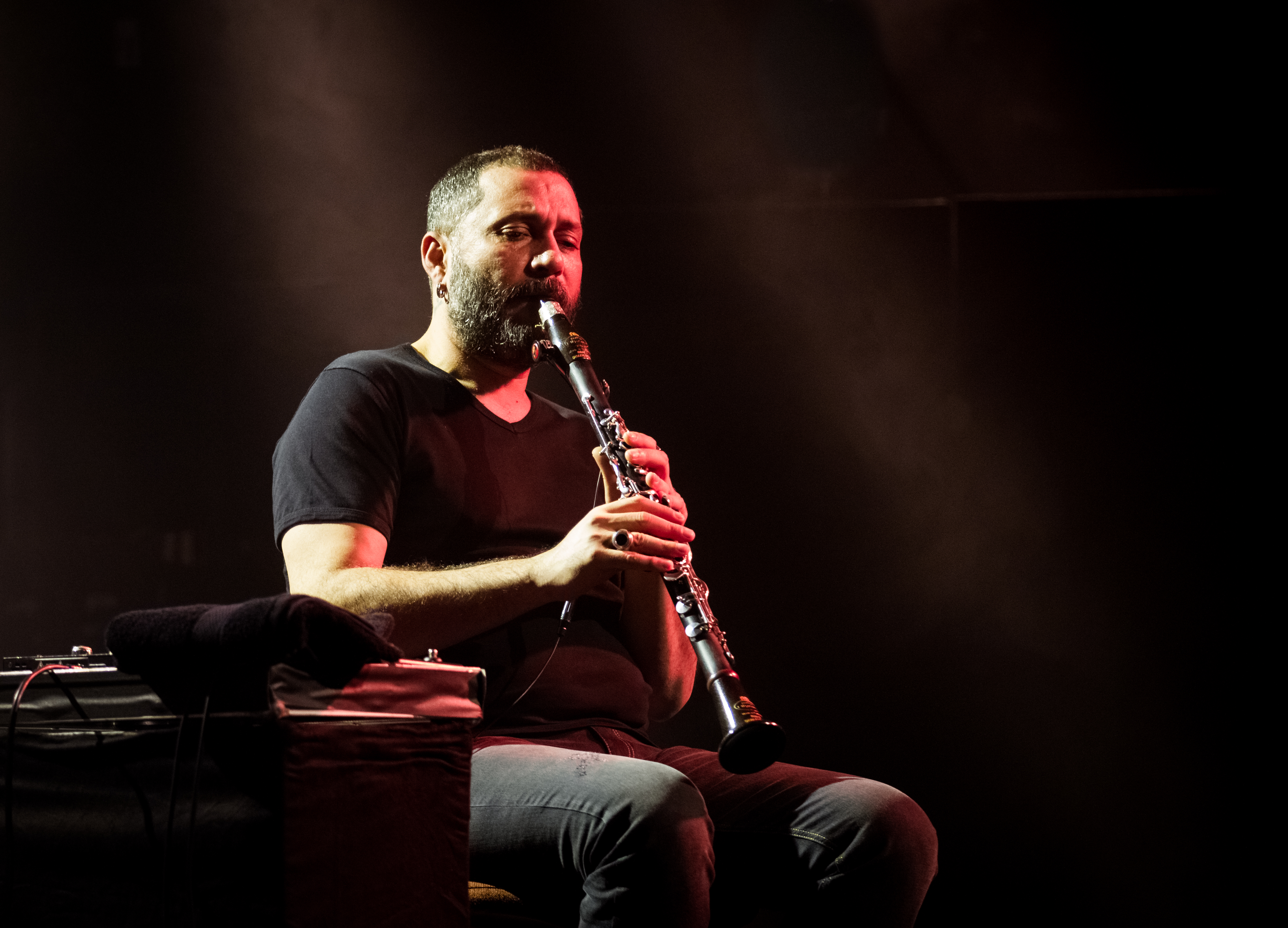
Hüsnü Şenlendirici with Taksim Trio live at Leverkusener Jazztage 2015

Hüsnü Şenlendirici (born 12 July 1976 in Bergama, Turkey) is a Turkish musician of Romani Background. He comes from a family of musicians: his grandfather Hüsnü Şenlendirici played clarinet and trumpet, his other grandfather Otmar Köfteci used to play clarinet, and his father Ergün Şenlendirici played trumpet.

== Life and work ==
In 1988 Hüsnü Şenlendirici studied at the State Conservatory of Turkish Music of the Istanbul Technical University which he left in 1992 without a degree. He played in percussionist Okay Temiz' Magnetic Band project and performed at hundreds of festivals in Turkey.

He also was a member of the band "Laço" with his father Ergün Senlendirici. With his own ensemble Sulukule, he plays traditional belly dancing music. He also founded the bands "Laço Tayfa" and "Hüsnü Şenlendirici & Saz Arkadaşları" with which he has given numerous concerts at home and abroad and has participated in festivals. He has accompanied many musicians of Turkish music. With the group "Laço Tayfa" he released the album "Bergama Gaydası". In 2005 he released his solo album "Hüsn-ü Klarnet".

In Istanbul, in July 2012, he performed with Dhafer Yousseff, Aytaç Doğan and others.

== Discography ==
- Brooklyn Funk Essentials & Laço Tayfa – In the Buzzbag (Doublemoon, 1998)
- Hüsnü Şenlendirici & Laço Tayfa – Bergama Gaydası (Doublemoon, 2000)
- Laço Tayfa – Hicaz Dolap (Doublemoon, 2002)
- Hüsnü Şenlendirici – The Joy of the Clarinet (Doublemoon, 2005)
- Hüsnü Şenlendirici & Trio Chios – Ege'nin yanı iki ("Both sides of the Aegean") (Doublemoon, 2010)
- Hüsnü Şenlendirici – Hüsn-ü Hicaz (Sony Music, 2011)
- Hüsnü Şenlendirici – Hüsn-ü Avare (Sony Music, 2015)
