= Clubland's Greatest Hits =

Greatest hits album by Joi Cardwell
- Released: November 10, 1998
- Genre: House
- Length: 120:15
- Label: K-Tel; Cold Front Records
- Producer: Joi Cardwell (exec.); Kazuhiko Gomi; Hex Hector; Hani Al-Bader; Junior Vasquez; Carlton Carter; Phillip Damien; Michael T. Diamond; Frankie Knuckles; Deep Dish; George Morel

Joi Cardwell chronology
Joi Cardwell (1997)	Clubland's Greatest Hits (1998)	Deliverance (1999)

Clubland's Greatest Hits is the first compilation album released by American singer Joi Cardwell through K-Tel and Cold Front Records on November 10, 1998. It marked her first album release, following her defunct from Eightball Records, as well her first and last album for K-Tel and Cold Front Records. The greatest hits album features the highest-charting singles from Cardwell's two studio albums released between 1995 and 1997 as well as a few remixes of her past singles.

== Background ==
In 1998, Cardwell departed from Eightball Records. The two-disc collection comprising eight songs and a variety of remixes was later released by K-Tel in collaboration with Cold Front Records. In an interview with Billboard, Cardwell stated, "Oh, that compilation was such a fiasco." when talking about her then-new greatest hits album More (1992–2003).

Clubland's Greatest Hits received a mixed review from The Boston Phoenix's Michael Freedberg, who criticized the album's content by saying, "These 14 tracks aren't clubland's greatest hits but Cardwell has long been one of the first-called house-music divas, and these songs tell why."

== Track listing ==
Clubland's Greatest Hits – Disc one
No.	Title	Writer(s)	Producer(s)	Length
1.	"You Got to Pray (Gomi Lair's X Beat Vocal)"	Joi Cardwell; Willy Washington	Cardwell; Kazuhiko Gomi	7:51
2.	"You Got to Pray (Gomi's Lair X Beat Dub Dub)"	Cardwell; Washington	Cardwell; Gomi	7:50
3.	"Love & Devotion (Da Morel Gliding Dub)"	Cardwell; James Preston	Carlton Carter; George Morel	7:47
4.	"Love & Devotion (Da Morel Gliding Mix)"	Cardwell; Preston	Carlton Carter; George Morel	9:32
5.	"Soul to Bare (Hex Hector Remix)"	Cardwell	Hex Hector	9:10
6.	"Soul to Bare (Hani Remix)"	Cardwell	Hani Al-Bader	13:40
7.	"Power (Michael T. Diamond Mix)"	Cardwell	Michael T. Diamond	9:21
Total length:				120:15

Clubland's Greatest Hits – Disc two
No.	Title	Writer(s)	Producer(s)	Length
1.	"Trouble (Junior's Black And Blue)"	Cardwell; Preston	Junior Vasquez	10:27
2.	"Trouble (Deep Dish Vocal Remix)"	Cardwell; Washington	Deep Dish	9:43
3.	"Jump for Joi (Spike Classical Dub)"	Cardwell; Preston	Darrin Friedman; Hector	9:12
4.	"Jump For Joi (Spike Vocal)"	Cardwell; Preston	Friedman; Hector	9:44
5.	"Run to You (Eddie Vs. Dezrok Vocal Mix)"	Cardwell; Phillip Damien	Dezrok; Eddie Baez	12:52
6.	"Found Love (Gomi's Global Village Vocal Mix)"	Cardwell; Frankie Knuckles; Peter "Ski" Schwartz	Gomi	10:26
7.	"Found Love (Gomi's Alternative Vocal Mix)"	Cardwell; Knuckles; Schwartz	Gomi	4:36

== Personnel ==
Credits adapted from the liner notes of Clubland's Greatest Hits.

- Joi Cardwell – lead vocals (All tracks), backing vocals, producer, executive producer, songwriting
- Hani Al-Bader – producer
- Eddie Baez – producer
- Marcia Button – graphic artist
- Konrad Carelli – additional recording engineer
- Carlton Carter – drums, programming, producer
- Fred Cash – bass guitar
- Phillip Damien – producer
- Deep Dish – producer
- Michael T. Diamond – producer
- Kazuhiko Gomi – programming, producer
- Hex Hector – producer
- Jon Kevin Jones – guitar
- Fred Jorio – programming
- Frankie Knuckles – producer
- Shedrick Mitchell – organ
- George Morel – drums, programming, producer
- James 'Sleepy Keys' Preston – piano, songwriting
- Warren Riker – mixing
- Anthony Saunders – engineer
- Peter "Ski" Schwartz – producer
- Duncan Stanbury – mastering
- Junior Vasquez – producer
- Willy Washington – songwriting
