= Cue Ball Wizard =

1992 pinball machine

- Manufacturer: Gottlieb
- Release date: October 1992
- Design: Jon Norris
- Artwork: David Moore, Constantino Mitchell, Jeanine Mitchell
- Production run: 5,700

Cue Ball Wizard is a pinball machine designed by Jon Norris and released in December 18 1992 by Gottlieb. It features a cue sports theme and was advertised with the slogan "Gottlieb Presents CUE BALL WIZARD!".

== Design ==
Cue Ball Wizard has a two and three ball Multiball and an oscillating captive ball kicker at the upper playfield. Its most noticeable feature, a full-sized captive cue ball that can be used to hit two elevated targets, is placed below on the lower playfield.

Due to the low cost of this cue ball feature, the budget for the game enabled an elevated motorized turret to be added.

The ramp is the game's most important shot, as it has to be hit once to light it up for the wagon wheel award.

== Gameplay ==
The wagon wheel contains all the modes the player must complete to reach Pool Ball Mania status.

The game includes two video modes. For one of these the player chooses an award from one of three curtains, but the award is predetermined making the choice meaningless. In the other video mode the player attempts to catch a series of four balls in a slow moving receptacle.

== Digital versions ==
Cue Ball Wizard is one of seven Gottlieb tables recreated and released in the PC version of Microsoft Pinball Arcade in 1998.

Cue Ball Wizard released in 2014 as a licensed table of The Pinball Arcade for several platforms.

== See also ==
- Big Shot - a pool themed pinball machine by Gottlieb
- Eight Ball Deluxe - a cue sports themed pinball machine by Bally
