= Eight Ball Deluxe (video game) =

1993 video game

- Mac box art
- Developer: LittleWing (Mac); P.A.S. Systems (MS-DOS)
- Publisher: Amtex
- Platforms: Classic Mac OS, MS-DOS
- Release: 1993
- Genre: Pinball

Eight Ball Deluxe is a licensed simulation of the 1981 Bally Eight Ball Deluxe pinball machine. It was published in 1993 by Amtex for Classic Mac OS and MS-DOS.

== Gameplay ==
Eight Ball Deluxe uses a scrolling playfield. Various settings can be altered including the incline of the game, and strength of the bumpers. A "magnet option" allows the player to drag the ball with the mouse to experiment with the scoring features. The game includes left, right, and upwards nudges with realistic animations. The game uses the same scoring as the physical pinball machine. Players who achieved a high score could obtain a validation code to enter it into an Amtex tournament.

screenshot from DOS version

== Development ==
Eight Ball Deluxe is the second pinball game developed by LittleWing, after Tristan. The manual for the game lists pinball designer John Popadiuk as a consultant. The Mac version was unveiled at PAPA III in February 1993, with a public competition for a high score.

The PC version was developed shortly after the Mac version. This version includes an opening tune played on a banjo.

An upgraded PC version was released in 1994 with enhanced graphics.

== Reception ==
Reception

Review scores
Publication	Score
PC Zone	75%
Game Players	4.5/5
The Macintosh Bible Guide to Games	4/5
PC Review	5/10

The game was a best seller in Macintosh gaming world and was a 1993 Best Simulation Game Finalist of the Software Publishers Association (USA) awards. Computer Gaming World in 1993 stated that Eight Ball Deluxe "accurately recreates the art, sounds and digitized speech of the original ... gorgeous, playable and realistic", and was the "connoisseur's choice" among four reviewed games. PC Magazine said "This is the best pinball game around", with "absolutely authentic" ball physics. Compute praised the detail of the recreation, and the original machine for being a good game. Game Players praised the nudging and digitized sound effects. The Macintosh Bible Guide to Games found it to be a faithful recreation with authentic sounds and graphics, but that the game did not adjust for larger monitors. PC Review noted that the PC version had some flicker on slower machines, and that with only one table wasn't good value for money. Computer Games Strategy Plus praised the physics, audio, and the game manual, but criticized how quickly the score disappeared at the end of a game.
