= Eight Ball Deluxe =

1981 pinball machine

- Manufacturer: Bally
- Release date: April 1981
- System: Bally MPU AS-2518-35
- Players: 1-4
- Design: George Christian
- Artwork: Margaret Hudson
- Production run: 8,250 (1981 version); 2,388 (limited edition)

Eight Ball Deluxe is a pinball machine designed by George Christian and released by Bally in 1981. The game features a cue sports theme and was produced again in 1982 and 1984. The game is the successor to the 1977 Eight Ball pinball machine.

== Design ==
The game is a "basic, easy-to-understand game" with open playfield, and uses audio to attract players. The main character shown on the game is a friend of the husband of the artist, Margaret Hudson.

A limited edition was produced in 1982, incorporating excess backboxes produced for Rapid Fire, and using a smaller backglass. A few components were altered for improved longevity and ease of maintenance. A third production run was manufactured in 1984.

== Layout and gameplay ==
Eight Ball Deluxe has three flippers, including one on the left side of the game. There is a set of seven of drop targets on the right of the playfield, representing the solid billiard balls 1–7, or stripe balls 9-15. After knocking these down, the player can hit the single drop target at the top right of the machine to reveal a saucer representing the eight ball. Behind the set of seven drop-targets are stand up targets that spell out 'Deluxe'. Completing these will light one letter in Deluxe, displayed on the backglass. If the player spells the last letter of Deluxe on the backglass, the game awards up to three free games. A lane towards the upper left of the playfield contains four in-line drop-targets which control the bonus multiplier.

== Reception ==
Roger Sharpe reviewed the machine in Play Meter, rating it at 3.75/4, noting that its theme had always been successful in pinball. The graphics and speech were praised, with good gameplay even with its simple logic. In 1983, Sharpe called the game a "satisfying challenge".

The game was the "sleeper" hit of 1982, much more popular with players than anticipated by Bally.

A review in Pinball Player called it "one of those machines you either love or hate", with rather standard artwork.

Eight Ball Deluxe won the AMOA most played pinball machine award in 1982, and 1984. It won the Play Meter best of '82 pinball award with a third of the vote in that category.

== Digital versions ==
Eight Ball Deluxe was released in 1993 for MS-DOS and Macintosh, co-developed by Amtex and LittleWing.

Eight Ball Deluxe was also available as a licensed table of The Pinball Arcade for PC, iOS, PlayStation 3, PlayStation 4 and Android from August 2016, until its delisting on June 30, 2018.

== Legacy ==
A successor Bally game released in 1985 capitalized on the success of Eight Ball Deluxe by using the name Eight Ball Champ.

== See also ==
- Big Shot - a pool themed 1974 pinball machine by Gottlieb
- Cue Ball Wizard - a cue sports themed 1992 pinball machine by Gottlieb
