= Brooklyn Funk Essentials =

Music collective

- Also known as: BFE
- Genres: Acid jazz; funk; jazz rap
- Years active: 1993–2001, 2006–present
- Labels: Dorado; GrooveTown; RCA; Doublemoon; Shanachie; Comet
- Members: Lati Kronlund; Desmond Foster; Alison Limerick; Ebba Åsman; Kristoffer Wallman; Hux Nettermalm; Loic Gayot
- Past members: (see past members)
- Website: www.brooklynfunkessentials.com

Brooklyn Funk Essentials (abbreviated as BFE) are an American band formed in 1993 by musicians Arthur Baker and Lati Kronlund. The band are known for their eclectic sound; blending funk, hip hop, jazz, poetry, reggae, and disco music sometimes accredited to acid jazz. In the 1990s, the group became a staple of the New York City club scene.

== History ==
=== 1993–2002: Formation and early years ===
The band formed in 1993 at Arthur Baker's recording studio after Lati Kronlund recruited several musicians through individual connections and clubs. Kronlund connected with musicians Tony Allen, Bassy Bob Brockmann, Yuka Honda, DJ Jazzy Nice, E.J. Rodriguez, Joshua Roseman, Paul Shapiro, Bill Ware III, as well as vocalists Joi Cardwell, Papa Dee, Hanifah Walidah, Everton Sylvester, and David Allen. After the band recorded several songs, they began performing at different nightclubs.

The band released their debut album Cool and Steady and Easy on United Kingdom label Dorado Records in 1994. The album's lead single "The Creator Has a Master Plan" was a cover version of Pharoah Sanders' 1969 song, which featured Cardwell on lead vocals and a rap verse by Papa Dee. In August 1994, the band signed with GrooveTown Records, a subsidiary of RCA Records. On June 27, 1995, the album was released in the United States. In the summer of 1995, they toured as the opening acts for Ben Harper and Michael Franti and Spearhead. In late 1995, Stephanie McKay replaced Cardwell after she left the group to pursue her solo career. After the Turkey-leg of their tour in 1996, the group began recording their second album in Istanbul.

In March 1997, the band released a single "Big Apple Boogaloo". They released a follow-up extended play titled Little Way Different, which contained six songs that would later appear on what would be their third studio album. Their second album, In the BuzzBag, was released in September 1998 on Doublemoon Records and Shanachie Records. The album spawned a single "Magick Karpet Ride". By 2000, the band had reunited with their first record label Dorado Records to release their third album Make Them Like It. After touring as the opening act alongside James Brown, Parliament-Funkadelic, and Erykah Badu, the group disbanded in 2001.

=== 2006–2016: Reformation and reunion ===
In 2006, the Brooklyn Funk Essentials reformed for the recording of their fourth album. While most of the band's previous members relocated away from New York, the band moved forward with a lineup composed of veteran members Lati Kronlund, Papa Dee, Hanifah Walidah, Desmond Foster, Everton Sylvester, Yancy Drew, Iwan VanHetten, and Philippe Monrose; along with new member and saxophonist Erik Hausler. In May 2008, they released their fourth album Watcha Playin. The band soon participated in an international concert tour, opening for Hüsnü Şenlendirici.

After another hiatus, the band reformed for their fifth album, which also consisted of original members Joi Cardwell and Stephanie McKay participating in the studio sessions. The band also reunited with their debut record label Dorado Records. Brooklyn Funk Essentials released their fifth album Funk Ain't Ova on Dorado Records in November 2015, which spawned the singles "Dance or Die", "Blast It!", and "Prepare". During the Funk Ain't Ova Tour, the band added lead singer Alison Limerick to the lineup. In 2016, original member Papa Dee left the group to pursue a solo career.

=== 2019–present: Stay Good and Intuition ===
In September 2019, the band released their sixth album Stay Good, which featured Alison Limerick and Desmond Foster as the main vocalists. During the Stay Good Tour, the band was forced to halt their concert tour due to the COVID-19 pandemic. In 2021, they were able to resume their tour and also headlined the Jazz à Vienne. During the tour, trombonist Ebba Åsman was added to the lineup along with keyboard player Kristoffer Wallman who had played synthesizer on the Cool & Steady & Easy album.

In 2022, they released the two singles: "Scream!" and "AA Side Single". In February 2023, the band release a single "How Happy". In May 2023, they released their seventh album Intuition.

== Members ==
Current members

- Lati Kronlund – bass, keyboard, guitar, music director (1993–present)
- Desmond Foster – vocals, guitar (1999–present)
- Alison Limerick – lead vocals (2016–present)
- Ebba Åsman – trombone and vocals (2022–present)
- Kristoffer Wallman – keyboards, synthesizer (1994, 2022–present)
- Hux Nettermalm – drums (2014–present)
- Loic Gayot – saxophone (2022–present)

Former members

- Arthur Baker – sampler (1993–1998)
- Tony Allen – drums (1993–1994)
- Bassy Bob Brockmann – trumpet, keyboards (1993–2001)
- Joi Cardwell – lead vocals (1993–1995, 2015)
- Papa Dee – vocals (1993–2016)
- DJ Jazzy Nice – turntables (1993–2001)
- Yuka Honda – keyboards (1993–1995)
- E.J. Rodriguez – percussion (1993–2001)
- Joshua Roseman – trombone (1993–2001)
- Paul Shapiro - saxophone, flute (1993–2001)
- David Allen – spoken word (1993–1994)
- Hanifah Walidah – spoken word, vocals (1993–2015)
- Everton Sylvester – spoken word (1993–2001, 2006, 2015, 2022)
- Bill Ware III – vibraphone (1993–2001)
- Yancy Drew – drums (1994–2001, 2006–2012)
- Stephanie McKay – lead vocals (1995–2001, 2015)
- ATN Stadwijk – keyboards (1995–2001)
- Masa Shimizu – guitar (1999–2000, 2015)
- André Atkins – trombone (2001)
- Dave Jensen – saxophone (2001)
- Philippe Monrose – percussion (2001–2008)
- Vanessa Pinard-Jacquemin – vocals (2001)
- Tony Taylor – drums (2001, 2012)
- Iwan VanHetten – keyboards, trumpet (2001–2019)
- Erik Hausler – saxophone, flute (2006–2012)
- André Atkins – trombone (2012)
- Anna Brooks – saxophone, vocals (2012–2014)
- Morgan Ågren – drums (2013)
- Sven Andersson – saxophone (2021)

== Discography ==
Albums

- Cool and Steady and Easy (1994)
- In the BuzzBag (1998)
- Make Them Like It (2000)
- Watcha Playin (2008)
- Funk Ain't Ova (2015)
- Stay Good (2019)
- Intuition (2023)
- Black Butterfly (2026)

Singles

- "The Creator Has a Master Plan" (1994)
- "Take The L Train (To Brooklyn)" (1995)
- "Big Apple Boogaloo" (1997)
- "Magick Karpet Ride" (1998)
- "Mambo Con Dancehall" (2000)
- "I Got Cash" (2000)
- "Date with Baby" (2000)
- "Dance or Die" (2015)
- "Blast It!" (2015)
- "Prepare" (2015)
- "Watcha Want From Me" (2019)
- "Funk Ain't Ova" (2019)
- "No Strings" (2020)
- "Ain't Nothing" (2020)
- "Steps"
- "Scream!" (2022)
- "AA Side Single" (2022)
- "How Happy" (2023)
- "Rollin' (Love Will Be Here)" (2023)
- "Blow Your Brains Out" (2024)
- "Life During Wartime" (2025)
- "Never Give Up" (2025)
