= Joi Cardwell =

American singer (born 1967)

- Also known as: Joi Perez
- Born: Joi Bernadette Cardwell; October 8, 1967 (age 59); New York City
- Genres: House; R&B; pop; dance
- Occupations: Singer; songwriter; author; holistic health coach; lawyer
- Years active: 1988–present
- Labels: Curly Gurly Records; Nervous Records; No-Mad Industries; Eightball Records
- Formerly of: Brooklyn Funk Essentials
- Website: joicardwell.com

Joi Cardwell (born October 8, 1967) is an American singer and songwriter. Born and raised in New York City, she performed in various singing competitions as a child and rose to fame in the early 1990s as a guest vocalist for Lil Louis on the number-one Dance singles "Club Lonely" and "Saved My Life". The release of Cardwell's debut album, The World Is Full of Trouble (1995), established her as a solo artist and featured the US top-five Dance Club Songs "Jump for Joi" and "Love & Devotion". Her second album, Joi Cardwell (1997), produced top-charting singles "Soul to Bare", "Run to You", and "Found Love".

In 1999, she released her third album, Deliverance, on her own record label, No-Mad Industries. Her fourth album, The Plain Jane Project (2005), yielded the top-ten singles "Freedom" and "It's Over". She continued to release albums on her recording label including Wanderlust (The Soundtrack) (2009) and Must Be the Music (2011). In 2014, Cardwell resurfaced with her seventh album The Art of Being, which was released on her new recording label Curly Gurly Records.

In 2016, Billboard magazine ranked her at No. 43 amongst the Greatest of All Time Top Dance Club Artists.

== Early life ==
Born in New York City in the late-1960s and raised in various areas of Queens. Cardwell appeared on stage at Carnegie Hall at the age of five in a dance recital, and was used to being on a stage by the time she was a teenager. She worked as a back-up session singer for Melba Moore, Jermaine Jackson, LL Cool J, and The Pointer Sisters. After graduating from New York University with degrees in English and Music in the mid-1980s, she studied voice for a year primarily to master control, as she had already developed and retained her own personal style. After her studies, she wrote and published songs for major R&B acts such as Kashif, L.A. Posse, and Malika Thomas.

== Career ==
=== 1988–1993: Beginnings ===
Her close affiliation with Kashif led to an album deal with Arista Records in 1988 for her pop R&B girl-group, The Promise. Since the market in the 1980s was already saturated with sweet-sounding, bubbly R&B groups, it was difficult for The Promise to stand. As a result, Cardwell decided to answer an ad in the Village Voice that read, "Epic recording artist looking for a background singer for a live tour." The recording artist turned out to be house-music innovator Lil Louis. She recorded two songs; "Club Lonely" and "Saved My Life" for Lil Louis' album Journey with the Lonely, which both peaked at number 1 on Billboard's Dance Club Songs chart.

Cardwell's experience as a vocalist and songwriter turned out to be exactly what Lil Louis had been searching for in a singer. He proved to be an early influence for Cardwell's sound, which melds a new dance beat with a thoughtful lyrical twist. Cardwell creates material that sounds as though she's musing quietly about life while a dancing throng gyrates with joy nearby, and her lyrics are soulful, romantic, and thought-provoking. Shortly after meeting Lil Louis, Cardwell conceived the single "Dancing in My Sleep", and within a week of penning it, she was in Chicago cutting demos and well on her way to a career as a dance-hall diva and R&B songstress. When "Club Lonely" reached the number one mark, Cardwell distanced herself from the Lil Louis project. In 1993, she toured in Japan for eight months as a background singer for Japanese soul singer Toshinobu Kubota. Cardwell gleaned experience from the large overseas tour returned to the U.S. significantly more focused and ready to tackle a solo singing career.

=== 1994–1998: The World Is Full of Trouble and Joi Cardwell ===
In 1994, Cardwell signed a recording contract with Eightball Records, an independent label based in New York. In 1994, Cardwell released her first single "Trouble" on Eight Ball Records, which was a double-pack single including remixes from Junior Vasquez, Sotoshi Tomiie, and Deep Dish. The song charted at number 11 on the Dance chart. She also released a non-album single "Holdin' On" with Jay Mac. Her first solo album The World Is Full of Trouble was released on May 15, 1995. The album spawned the top-charted singles "Jump for Joi" and "Love & Devotion". In 1995, she recorded the single "Luv Connection" for Towa Tei's album Future Listening!. Cardwell contributed guest vocals on the single "The Creator Has A Master Plan" for the Brooklyn Funk Essentials' album Cool & Steady & Easy. She also toured with the group throughout the year. In 1996, she toured as a backing vocalist for Toshinobu Kubota on the Oyeees! Tour. In July 1996, she released the single "You Got to Pray". The single peaked at number 1 on Billboard's Dance Club Play chart.

Cardwell's eponymous second solo album Joi Cardwell was released on November 11, 1997, in the US. The album's lead single "Soul to Bare" reached the top five on the Billboard Dance Club Play chart. The second international single "Run to You" was a commercial success, reaching number one in the United States. The album also produced two other singles; "Found Love" and "Power". By December 1997, Cardwell had sold a total of over 1.5 million records worldwide. In 1998, Cardwell left Eightball Records. In November 1998, she released a two-disc compilation Clubland's Greatest Hits which features a few club mixes of her earlier singles on Eightball Records.

=== 1999–2004: Deliverance and More ===
In April 1999, Cardwell self-produced and released the lead single "Last Chance for Love" of her forthcoming album. The song peaked at number 17 on the Dance Club chart. She later released her third album Deliverance on her new independent recording label "No-Mad Industries". A second single "Superstar", an interpretation of Delaney & Bonnie's "Superstar", was also released. In 2000, "Last Chance for Love" won for "Best Dance Song" by the GLAMA Awards. In February 2000, a remixed version of "Jump for Joi" was released on Nervous Records. The remix single peaked at number 7 on the Dance Club chart. In 2001, she toured again as a background vocalist for her long-time friend Toshinobu Kubota during the Nothing But As One Tour.

In September 2003, Cardwell released a compilation album More (1992–2003), which featured unreleased songs and new remixes. The album spawned the singles "After the Rain" and "If You're Ever Lonely", which were released on her manager's label, Junior Vasquez Music. In 2004, she participated in the Keep Hope Alive Project to benefit LIFEbeat, the music industry AIDS-awareness organization. Cardwell appeared alongside other house-genre singers on the song "Keep Hope Alive" and she also co-wrote and recorded a song "Be Yourself", which appear on the Underground Dance Artists United For Life: Keep Hope Alive album. In 2004, she released her greatest hits album entitled Hits and More.

=== 2005–2010: The Plane Jane Project and Wanderlust (The Soundtrack) ===
On November 18, 2005, Cardwell released her fourth studio album, The Plain Jane Project. The album features more R&B-styled songs as opposed to her earlier electronic dance and house records. The album's lead single "Freedom" spent thirteen weeks on the Dance Club Play chart before peaking at number 7. The second single "It's Over" peaked at number 4 on the chart. The album's final single "What It Feels Like" peaked at number 30 on the Dance chart.

Her compilation album A Beautiful Life was released on May 7, 2007, in Japan-only. The eleven-track album featured a combination of past singles and DJ mixes. On April 7, 2009, she released her fifth album Wanderlust (The Soundtrack). The album spawn the singles "Imperfect", "Happy", "People Make the World Go Round", "Come Together", "Change the World", and "What's Freedom". Her single "People Make The World Go Round" received an IDMA Awards' nomination for "Best House/Garage Track".

=== 2010–2015: Must Be the Music and The Art of Being ===
In June 2010, she released a maxi-single "All Night", which features the original version and various remixes of the song. A single "We Got the Night" was released, which featured production and mixing by Chus & Ceballos and DJ Koutarou.A. Caldwell released her sixth album Must Be the Music on March 19, 2011. In July 2011, she released her original song "How Deep Is Your Love?".

In 2013, she released a single "Love Somebody Else", which earned an IDMA award for "Best House/Garage/Deep House Track of the Year". In September 2014, Cardwell released her seventh album The Art of Being on her own independent recording label Curly Gurly Records. The album spawned the singles "Return to Love", "Feels Like Heaven", "Indian Giver", "Lucky Charm", "Shot through the Heart", and new remix of "Jump 4 Joi".

=== 2016–present: Keep Your Eye on the Game and Not the Fame and retirement from music ===
In 2016, Cardwell released a single "What Love's Gonna Do". In May 2017, she re-released her business book titled "Keep Your Eye on the Game and Not the Fame", which was originally released in 2001. On May 26, 2017, Cardwell announced through her Facebook that she would be retiring from the music industry, following a few more music releases and that she would open a wellness center. On June 2, 2017, she released a single called "We Can Do Better". In collaboration with DJ Gomi, a maxi-single was released featuring six remixed version of "We Can Do Better". On June 16, 2017, Cardwell released another single titled "Days of Our Lives".

On October 13, 2017, Cardwell was featured on the track "State of Confusion" from the debut album by DJ and producer Honey Dijon, The Best of Both Worlds. In March 2018, Cardwell released a new version of her single titled "Trouble 2018". On June 1, 2018, Cardwell released her eighth album "Pride and Joi". The album contained new remixes of her previous singles.

== Artistry ==
=== Voice and songwriting ===
Cardwell's voice is a mezzo-soprano despite sometimes being classified as an alto. Barry Walters of The Advocate highlights her tone and timbre as particularly distinctive, described her voice as "more subtle, more ethereal and seductive." Other critics praise her vocal abilities, with Larry Flick of Billboard saying she "proved her potential as a multiformat star with a funk version of "Jump for Joi" that exploded with Ella Fitzgerald-style scatting."

Cardwell's music is generally house, but she also incorporates traditional jazz, funk, and blues into her songs. Deliverance demonstrated Cardwell's exploration of neo soul, as well as further use of soul and hip hop than compared to previous releases. While she exclusively releases English songs, Cardwell have performed several Japanese songs for Toshinobu Kubota (as a backup singer during his concert tours for a Japanese audience). To perform them, Cardwell was coached progressively by Kubota.

She has received co-writing credits for most of the songs recorded with Lil Louis and her solo efforts. Her songs were personally driven by dance themed compositions like "Run to You" and "You Got to Pray". Cardwell believes that, "Lyrics have to be meaningful and memorable enough that people will insist on keeping the vocals on the tracks." She has also received production credits for many of the records in which she has been involved, especially during her solo efforts. As an accomplished pianist, Cardwell incorporates piano into a majority of her songs and often writes about love. She also played a violin, and piano, on the song "Brittany" for Lil Louis' album From the Mind of Lil Louis.

=== Influences ===
Her musical influences included Billie Holiday, Barbra Streisand, and Minnie Riperton. Cardwell credits Ashford and Simpson, Marvin Gaye, and Curtis Mayfield as her songwriting influences. Her influences also include Sarah Vaughn and Donna Summer, the latter of whom she has been compared to.

== Business and ventures ==
=== Jump for Joi Wellness Center ===
In 2017, Cardwell announced her plans to open a wellness center. She later earned certifications in yoga, meditation, and as a holistic health coach. She also trained in trauma informed practices, yoga as a peace practice, and yoga nidra. In 2019, Cardwell opened the Jump for Joi Wellness Center in West Palm Beach, Florida. The wellness center offers classes and programs in gentle yoga, asana, yoga nidra, pre-natal yoga, and guided meditation for children.

=== Law association ===
In 2024, Cardwell graduated with a Juris Doctor degree from Florida A&M University College of Law. In May 2025, she was admitted to The Florida Bar.

== Personal life ==
In September 2024, she married Diana Perez.

== Discography ==
- The World Is Full of Trouble (1995)
- Joi Cardwell (1997)
- Deliverance (1999)
- The Plain Jane Project (2005)
- Wanderlust (The Soundtrack) (2009)
- Must Be the Music (2011)
- The Art of Being (2014)
- Pride and Joi (2018)

== Tours ==
Headlining

- Brooklyn Funk Essentials Tour (1995)
- My First Christmas with You Japan Tour (1995–1996)
- The Joi Cardwell Tour (1997)
- Greatest Hits Album Tour (2011)
- The Art of Being Tour (2015)
- European Tour (2016)

Supporting

- Évry'ting Cook An Curie! Tour (1993) (with Toshinobu Kubota)
- Oyeees! Tour (1996) (with Toshinobu Kubota)
- Nothing But As One Tour (2001) (with Toshinobu Kubota)

== Books ==
- Keep Your Eye on the Game and Not the Fame (2001)
- Jump for Joi: Thoughts for Inner Strength Vol. 1 (2017)
- Jump for Joi: Thoughts for Inner Strength Vol. 2 (2017)

== Awards and nominations ==
=== GLAMA Awards ===
Year	Nominee / work	Award	Result
1997	"You Got to Pray"	Best Dance Song	Won
2000	"Last Chance for Love"	Best Dance Song	Won

=== IDMA Awards ===
Year	Nominee / work	Award	Result
2009	"People Make the World Go Round"	Best House/Garage Track	Nominated
2013	"Love Somebody Else"	Best House/Garage/Deep House Track	Won

== See also ==
- List of number-one dance hits (United States)
- List of artists who reached number one on the US Dance chart
