= Hawk's Well Theatre =

Theatre in Sligo, Ireland

- Location within Ireland
- Address: Temple Street
- Location: Sligo F91 EDE9, Republic of Ireland
- Coordinates: 54.269°N 8.477°W
- Capacity: 340

Construction
- Opened: 12 January 1982; 44 years ago

Website
- www.hawkswell.com

The Hawk's Well Theatre opened in Sligo Town on 12 January 1982. Located next to Sligo's tourist office, it was the first purpose-built theatre in rural Ireland.

== History ==
When the theatre opened on 12 January 1982, it was the first purpose-built theatre in 'rural Ireland'. (Note: While Sligo Town is an urban area of population c. 20,000 the surrounding county and province of Connacht is predominantly rural) The then president of Ireland, Patrick Hillery, attended the opening. It was named after W. B. Yeats play At the Hawk's Well, and was a result of an initiative of the Arts Council and Bord Fáilte.

In 2002, it was the subject of an RTÉ television documentary on the "Townlands" series.

In a 2019 article in The Irish World, the theatre was described as "binding people together, bridging perceived boundaries and manifesting the spirit of enterprise which are intended to build a bright future for the local economy".

As it approached its 40 year anniversary, the 340 seats in the theatre were scheduled to be replaced in August 2020.

== Programmes ==
Since 1966, the theatre has hosted the Yeats Summer School, named after the Irish poet and dramatist W. B. Yeats, who is associated with the region. The Sligo Fun Company is based at the theatre and organises theatrical productions and programmes for school-aged children.

== Notable people ==
By 1993, the Hawk's Well theatre had developed some of Ireland's "premier actors". Other performers, associated with the theatre, include Westlife members and Sligo natives Shane Filan, Kian Egan and Mark Feehily. The performers had featured in the Sligo Fun Company's production of Grease while in secondary school. They then formed a six-member boyband with three other friends and played four nights at the theatre before Filan's mother contacted Louis Walsh, eventually leading to the formation of Westlife.
