= Eightball Records =

- Founded: 1990
- Founder: Alex Kaplan, Wayne Hunter, Kevin Williams
- Genre: House, garage rock, techno, progressive house
- Country of origin: U.S.
- Location: New York City
- Official website: www.eightballrecords.com

Eightball Records is an American independent record label established 1990 in New York City by Alex Kaplan, DJ Smash, and A&R head Kevin Williams. It played an important role in the development of house music, techno, and deep house in the 1990s.

== History ==
Eightball was formed in 1990 by Wayne Hunter and Alex Kaplan in New York City. Originally a vinyl store, it specialized in recording and selling many dance and house music records. It later became an official recording label. Kaplan hired Kevin Williams and John Creamer as the label's A&Rs, and Serebe Kironde as the General Manager.

The label became home to a wide range of artists such as Joi Cardwell, Screamin Rachael, Mack Vibe, Lectroluv, Mix Master G-Flexx, Zoel, Napoleon Soul O, and co-owner DJ Smash. The label's debut single "Come On Girl" by Napoleon Soul O and C.J. Smith was released in 1991. Cardwell, who was recruited in 1994, premiered her debut single "Trouble" at the Billboard Dance Music Summit. The song became the label's first charting single which peaked at number 11 on the Dance chart.

In 1998, Jerome Farley became the Director of A&R of Eightball and subsidiary Empire State Records.

== Subsidiaries ==
- Empire State Records

== Discography ==
This list contains selected studio and compilation album releases on Eightball Records.

1994

- Groove Thing – The Adventure
- Lectroluv – The Difference
- Lectroluv – Remix Project
- Mack Vibe – Mr. Meaner
- Paul 'Trouble' Anderson – The Sound Of New York

1995

- Joi Cardwell – The World Is Full of Trouble
- Lectroluv – The Original Collection
- Butter Foundation – East Side Drive/Anati
- Eightball, Corner Pocket (record label compilation album)
- Frankie Bones – 2 Clues EP

1996

- BlueJean – Try My Lovin'
- B Factor – Make It Better
- Jazz Not Jazz: The Original Collection (record label compilation album)
- The Girl! – Fired Up: The Remixes

1997

- Joi Cardwell – Joi Cardwell
- Groove Thing – This Is No Time
- Peace Bureau – Inner City Booms
- Easy One (record label compilation album)

1998

- Joi Cardwell – 8 Ball EP
- Mix Master G-Flexx – We Shine
- The Soul of Eightball (record label compilation album)
- Christian Scott – The Enchanter Chants EP
- Æther – Give Away My Fear

== See also ==
- List of independent record labels
- List of record labels
