= Jill Scott discography =

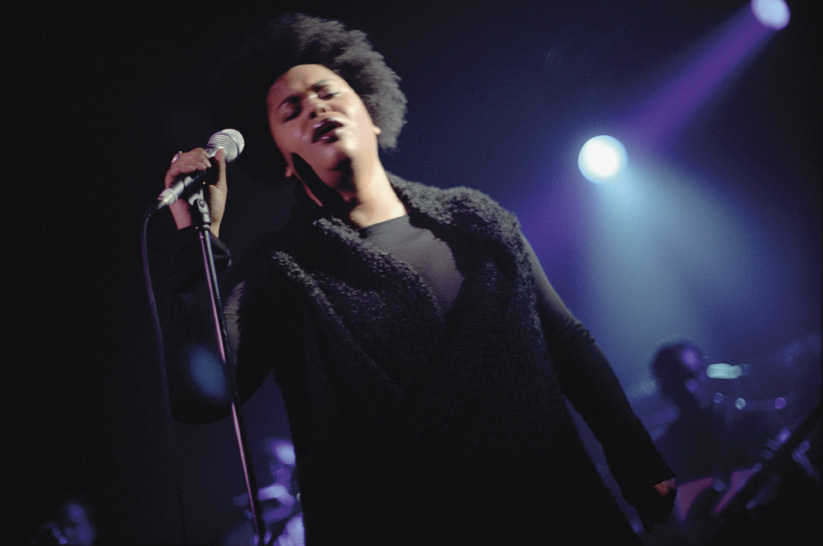
- Scott performing in 2000
- Studio albums: 6
- Live albums: 2
- Compilation albums: 4
- Remix albums: 1
- Singles: 21
- Music videos: 17
- Promotional singles: 5

This article contains the discography of American singer and songwriter Jill Scott, including studio albums, live albums, compilation albums, DVDs and singles.

== Albums ==
=== Studio albums ===
List of studio albums, with selected chart positions, sales and certifications
Title	Album details	Peak chart positions										Sales	Certifications
Title	Album details	US	US R&B	BEL	FRA	NLD	NOR	NZ	SWE	SWI	UK	Sales	Certifications
Who Is Jill Scott?: Words and Sounds Vol. 1	Released: July 18, 2000; Label: Hidden Beach / Epic; Formats: CD, LP, cassette, digital download	17	2	—	—	78	37	47	27	78	69	US: 2,500,000	RIAA: 2× Platinum; BPI: Gold; MC: Gold
Beautifully Human: Words and Sounds Vol. 2	Released: August 31, 2004; Label: Hidden Beach / Epic; Formats: CD, LP, digital download	3	1	41	56	31	—	—	24	31	27	US: 880,000	RIAA: Gold; BPI: Silver
The Real Thing: Words and Sounds Vol. 3	Released: September 25, 2007; Label: Hidden Beach; Formats: CD, LP, digital download	4	2	—	128	65	—	—	—	65	79	US: 665,000	RIAA: Gold
The Light of the Sun	Released: June 21, 2011; Label: Blues Babe / Warner Bros.; Formats: CD, LP, digital download	1	1	99	103	51	—	—	—	54	69	US: 480,000	
Woman	Released: July 24, 2015; Label: Blues Babe / Atlantic; Formats: CD, digital download	1	1	125	119	28	—	—	—	79	54	US: 250,000	
To Whom This May Concern	Releasing: February 13, 2026; Label: Blues Babe / Human Re Sources / The Orchard; Formats: CD, digital download	33	10	—	—	—	—	—	—	—	—		

=== Compilation albums ===
List of compilation albums, with selected chart positions
Title	Album details	Peak chart positions	
Title	Album details	US	US R&B
Collaborations	Released: January 30, 2007; Label: Hidden Beach; Formats: CD, digital download	11	3
The Original Jill Scott from the Vault, Vol. 1	Released: August 30, 2011; Label: Hidden Beach; Formats: CD, digital download	28	6
Golden Moments	Released: June 16, 2015; Label: Hidden Beach; Formats: CD, digital download	—	—
By Popular Demand	Released: September 28, 2018; Label: Hidden Beach; Formats: LP, digital download	—	—

=== Remix albums ===
List of remix albums, with selected details
Title	Album details
Spring Summer Feeling: Crates Remix Fundamentals Vol. 1	Released: June 25, 2012; Label: Hidden Beach; Formats: CD, digital download

=== Live albums ===
List of live albums, with selected chart positions
Title	Album details	Peak chart positions			Certifications
Title	Album details	US	US R&B	NLD	Certifications
Experience: Jill Scott 826+	Released: November 20, 2001; Label: Hidden Beach / Epic; Formats: CD, digital download	38	7	93	RIAA: Gold
Live in Paris+	Released: February 5, 2008; Label: Hidden Beach; Formats: CD, digital download	—	—	—	RIAA: Gold

== Singles ==
List of singles, with selected chart positions and parent album
Title	Year	Peak chart positions					Album
Title	Year	US	US R&B	US Adult R&B	NLD	UK	Album
"Love Rain"	2000	—	—	—	—	—	Who Is Jill Scott? Words and Sounds Vol. 1
"Gettin' In the Way"	2000	— (Note: "Gettin' In the Way" did not enter the Billboard Hot 100, but peaked at number 15 on the Bubbling Under Hot 100 chart.)	28	3	—	30	Who Is Jill Scott? Words and Sounds Vol. 1
"A Long Walk"	2001	43	9	1	—	54	Who Is Jill Scott? Words and Sounds Vol. 1
"The Way"	2001	60	15	2	—	—	Who Is Jill Scott? Words and Sounds Vol. 1
"He Loves Me (Lyzel in E Flat)"	2002	— (Note: "He Loves Me (Lyzel in E Flat)" did not enter the Billboard Hot 100, but peaked at number 25 on the Bubbling Under Hot 100 chart.)	46	10	—	—	Experience: Jill Scott 826+
"Gimme"	2002	—	—	—	87	—	Experience: Jill Scott 826+
"Golden"	2004	— (Note: "Golden" did not enter the Billboard Hot 100, but peaked at number 10 on the Bubbling Under Hot 100 chart.)	31	6	—	59	Beautifully Human: Words and Sounds Vol. 2
"Whatever"	2005	— (Note: "Whatever" did not enter the Billboard Hot 100, but peaked at number 12 on the Bubbling Under Hot 100 chart.)	34	1	—	—	Beautifully Human: Words and Sounds Vol. 2
"Cross My Mind"	2005	—	38	6	—	—	Beautifully Human: Words and Sounds Vol. 2
"Daydreamin'" (Lupe Fiasco featuring Jill Scott)	2006	—	83	—	—	25	Food & Liquor / Collaborations
"Hate on Me"	2007	— (Note: "Hate on Me" did not enter the Billboard Hot 100, but peaked at number 7 on the Bubbling Under Hot 100 chart.)	24	9	—	—	The Real Thing: Words and Sounds Vol. 3
"My Love"	2007	—	31	10	—	—	The Real Thing: Words and Sounds Vol. 3
"So in Love" (featuring Anthony Hamilton)	2011	97	10	1	—	—	The Light of the Sun
"Shame" (featuring Eve and The A Group)	2011	—	—	—	—	—	The Light of the Sun
"So Gone (What My Mind Says)" (featuring Paul Wall)	2011	—	28	7	—	—	The Light of the Sun
"Blessed"	2012	—	21	1	—	—	The Light of the Sun
"You Don't Know"	2015	—	—	—	—	—	Woman
"Fool's Gold"	2015	—	—	3	—	—	Woman
"Back Together"	2016	—	—	6	—	—	Woman
"Can't Wait"	2016	—	—	3	—	—	Woman
"Pressha"	2026	—	—	1	—	—	To Whom This May Concern

=== Promotional singles ===
List of promotional singles, with selected chart positions and parent album
Title	Year	Peak chart positions	Album
Title	Year	US R&B	Album
"Shining Through (Theme from Save the Last Dance)" (featuring Fredro Starr)	2001	—	Save the Last Dance
"The Fact Is (I Need You)"	2006	63	Beautifully Human: Words and Sounds Vol. 2
"Whenever You're Around" (featuring George Duke)	2008	56	The Real Thing: Words and Sounds Vol. 3
"Lovely Day"	2011	67	The Original Jill Scott from the Vault, Vol. 1
"Comes To Light (Everything)"	2011	98	The Original Jill Scott from the Vault, Vol. 1

== Other appearances ==
Year	Song	Artist	Producer
1999	"The Rain"	Will Smith	Darren "Limitless" Henson, Jeff Townes
2001	"Said Enough"	The Isley Brothers	Andre Harris
2002	"Complexity"	The Roots	Black Thought, ?uestlove, Leonard Hubbard, James Gray, Omar Edwards
2002	"I Am Music"	Common	J Dilla, ?uestlove, James Poyser, Jeff Lee Johnson, Pino Palladino
2011	"Trapped"	Young Jeezy	J.U.S.T.I.C.E. League
2013	"Calls"	Robert Glasper	Robert Glasper
2015	"For the Love of Money"	Dr. Dre, Jon Connor	Dr. Dre
2015	"Sunshine"	Pusha T	Baauer, Kanye West, DJ Mano
2016	"Genesis"	De La Soul	Kelvin Mercer, Vincent Mason, David Jude Jolicoeur
2017	"Higher Calling"	Big K.R.I.T.	Justin Scott, Jonathan Priester
2017	"Until the Pain Is Gone"	Daley	Produced by Hitesh Ceon and Andre "Dre" Harris,
2020	"Jill/Jack"	Moses Sumney	Moses Sumney, Daniel Lopatin
2020	"Jill Scott"	Alicia Keys	Sean C
2020	"Sunkissed Child"	D Smoke	BattleCat, Larrance Dopson, Daniel Farris, Thomas Cauley
2022	"Chanel Pearls"	Conway The Machine	Daniel Cruz, Dylan Graham, Cozmo Beats

== Music videos ==
- "Gettin' in the Way"
- "A Long Walk"
- "The Way"
- "He Loves Me" (Jill's Home Video)
- "Gimme"
- "Golden"
- "Whatever"
- "Cross My Mind"
- "Hate on Me"
- "My Love"
- "Shame"
- "So in Love"
- "Hear My Call"
- "So Gone (What My Mind Says)"
- "Blessed"
- "You Don't Know"
- "Back Together″
