= Golden Moments (album) =

Compilation album by Jill Scott
- Released: 16 June 2015
- Recorded: 1999–2007
- Genres: Neo soul; R&B; funk; soul
- Length: 64:44
- Label: Hidden Beach Recordings
- Producers: Dre & Vidal; Carvin & Ivan; Robert Frost; Pete Kuzma; JR Hutson; Darren Henson; Keith Pelzer

Jill Scott chronology
The Original Jill Scott from the Vault, Vol. 1 (2011)	Golden Moments (2015)	Woman (2015)

Professional ratings
Review scores
Source	Rating
AllMusic	4/5 stars

Golden Moments is a compilation album by American recording artist Jill Scott, released June 16, 2015 on Hidden Beach Recordings. The album comprised Scott's best songs from her four albums with Hidden Beach Recordings. The album omits Scott's singles: "Love Rain", "Lovely Day" and "Whenever You're Around".

Featured are Scott's hit singles "The Way", "Hate on Me", "Gettin' In the Way", and the Top Ten R&B hit, "A Long Walk". Also included is a track titled, "Comes To Light (Everything)" from The Original Jill Scott from the Vault, Vol. 1, and a new unreleased rare track, an acoustic ballad, "I Adore You."

== Track listing ==
No.	Title	Writer(s)	Producer(s)	Length
1.	"Jilltro" (from Who Is Jill Scott? Words and Sounds Vol. 1, 2000)	Andre Harris; Darren Henson	Henson	1:03
2.	"Golden" (from Beautifully Human: Words and Sounds Vol. 2, 2004)	Jill Scott; Anthony Bell	Bell	3:46
3.	"He Loves Me (Lyzel In E Flat)" (from Who Is Jill Scott?, 2000)	Scott; Keith Pelzer	Pelzer	4:38
4.	"Crown Royal" (from The Real Thing: Words and Sounds Vol. 3, 2007)	Scott; Lee Hutson	Hutson	1:44
5.	"Slowly Surely" (from Who Is Jill Scott?, 2000)	Scott; Henson; Don Thompson	Henson	4:26
6.	"My Love" (from The Real Thing, 2007)	Scott; Adam Blackstone; Steve McKie	Blackstone	3:48
7.	"It's Love" (from Who Is Jill Scott?, 2000)	Scott; Henson; Pelzer	Henson; Pelzer	5:54
8.	"Hate on Me" (from The Real Thing, 2007)	Scott; Blackstone; McKie	Blackstone	3:28
9.	"Whatever" (from Beautifully Human, 2004)	Scott; Robert Frost	Robert Frost	4:23
10.	"Cross My Mind" (from Beautifully Human, 2004)	Scott; Henson; Pelzer	Henson; Pelzer	4:43
11.	"The Way" (from Who Is Jill Scott?, 2000)	Scott; Harris	Harris; Vidal Davis	4:11
12.	"The Fact Is (I Need You)" (from Beautifully Human, 2004)	Scott; Pete Kuzma	Kuzma	4:34
13.	"A Long Walk" (from Who Is Jill Scott?, 2000)	Scott; Harris	Harris; Davis	4:37
14.	"Comes To Light (Everything)" (from The Original Jill Scott from the Vault, Vol. 1, 2011)	Scott; Ronald Frost	Ronald Frost	4:43
15.	"I Adore You" (Unreleased)	Scott; Carvin Haggins; Ivan Barias; Frank Romano	Haggins; Barias	4:49
16.	"Gettin' In the Way" (from Who Is Jill Scott?, 2000)	Scott; Davis	Davis	3:56
17.	"Try" (from Who Is Jill Scott?, 2000)	Scott		3:59
