= List of awards and nominations received by Jill Scott =

This article contains the awards and nominations of the singer Jill Scott.

== BET Awards ==
Year	Nominee / work	Category	Result
BET Award
2001	Herself	Best New Artist	Nominated
2001	Herself	Best Female R&B Artist	Nominated
2005	Herself	Best Female R&B Artist	Nominated
2008	Why Did I Get Married?	Best Actress	Nominated
2008	Herself	Best J Award	Nominated
BET J Virtual Award
2008	Herself	Female Artist of the Year	Nominated
2008	Why Did I Get Married?	Best Actress	Nominated

== Billboard Music Awards ==
Year	Nominee / work	Category	Result
2001	Herself	Female R&B/Hip-Hop Artist of the Year	Won

== Grammy Awards ==
The Grammy Awards are awarded annually by the National Academy of Recording Arts and Sciences of the United States for outstanding achievements in the record industry. Scott has received 3 awards from 19 nominations.

Year	Nominee / work	Category	Result
2001	Herself	Best New Artist	Nominated
2001	Who Is Jill Scott? Words and Sounds Vol. 1	Best R&B Album	Nominated
2001	"Gettin' In the Way"	Best Female R&B Vocal Performance	Nominated
2002	"A Long Walk"	Best Female R&B Vocal Performance	Nominated
2003	"He Loves Me (Lyzel in E Flat) (Movements I, II, III)"	Best Female R&B Vocal Performance	Nominated
2005	"Whatever"	Best Female R&B Vocal Performance	Nominated
2005	Beautifully Human: Words and Sounds Vol. 2	Best R&B Album	Nominated
2005	"Cross My Mind"	Best Urban/Alternative Performance	Won
2007	"God Bless the Child" (with George Benson and Al Jarreau)	Best Traditional R&B Performance	Won
2008	"Hate on Me"	Best Female R&B Vocal Performance	Nominated
2008	The Real Thing: Words and Sounds Vol. 3	Best R&B Album	Nominated
2008	"Daydreamin'" (with Lupe Fiasco)	Best Urban/Alternative Performance	Won
2011	"Love" (with Chuck Brown and Marcus Miller)	Best R&B Performance by a Duo or Group with Vocals	Nominated
2017	"Can't Wait"	Best Traditional R&B Performance	Nominated
2027	To Whom This May Concern	Best R&B Album	Pending
2027	"To B Honest" (with JID)	Best R&B Collaboration or Duo/Group Performance	Pending
2027	"Pressha"	Best R&B Solo Performance	Pending
2027	"Pressha"	Best R&B Song	Pending
2027	"Beautiful People"	Best Traditional R&B Performance	Pending

== MTV Video Music Awards ==
Year	Nominee / work	Category	Result
2001	"Gettin' In the Way"	Best R&B Video	Nominated

== NAACP Image Awards ==
Year	Nominee / work	Category	Result
2001	Herself	Outstanding New Artist	Nominated
2001	Herself	Outstanding Female Artist	Nominated
2001	"Gettin' In the Way"	Outstanding Song	Nominated
2001	Who Is Jill Scott? Words and Sounds Vol. 1	Outstanding Album	Nominated
2002	Herself	Outstanding Female Artist	Nominated
2002	"Kingdom Come Theme Song" (with Kirk Franklin)	Outstanding Duo or Group	Nominated
2002	"He Loves Me (Lyzel In E Flat)"	Outstanding Song	Nominated
2002	Experience: Jill Scott 826+	Outstanding Album	Nominated
2005	Herself	Outstanding Female Artist	Nominated
2005	"Golden"	Outstanding Song	Nominated
2005	"Golden"	Outstanding Music Video	Nominated
2008	Herself	Outstanding Female Artist	Nominated
2008	Why Did I Get Married?	Outstanding Actress in a Motion Picture	Nominated
2010	The No. 1 Ladies' Detective Agency	Outstanding Actress in a Drama Series	Nominated
2011	Sins of the Mother	Outstanding Actress in a Television Movie, Mini-Series or Dramatic Special	Won
2011	Why Did I Get Married Too?	Outstanding Supporting Actress in a Motion Picture	Nominated
2012	Herself	Outstanding Female Artist	Won
2012	The Light of the Sun	Outstanding Album	Nominated
2012	"So in Love" (with Anthony Hamilton)	Outstanding Song	Nominated
2012	"Hear My Call"	Outstanding Music Video	Nominated
2013	Steel Magnolias	Outstanding Actress in a Television Movie, Mini-Series or Dramatic Special	Nominated
2016	Get On Up	Outstanding Supporting Actress in a Motion Picture	Nominated
2016	Herself	Outstanding Female Artist	Won
2016	"Back Together"	Outstanding Song, Traditional	Won
2016	Woman	Outstanding Album	Won
2016	With This Ring	Outstanding Actress in a Television Movie, Mini-Series or Dramatic Special	Nominated
2018	Flint	Outstanding Actress in a Television Movie, Mini-Series or Dramatic Special	Nominated
2020	First Wives Club	Outstanding Actress in a Comedy Series	Nominated
2021	"Jill Scott" (with Alicia Keys)	Outstanding Duo, Group or Collaboration (Traditional)	Nominated
2023	"Still Believe" (with PJ Morton and Alex Isley)	Outstanding Duo, Group or Collaboration (Traditional)	Nominated
2024	Jill Scott Presents: J.ill the Podcast	Outstanding Society and Culture Podcast	Nominated
2026	Ella	Outstanding Short Film - Live Action	Won

== Satellite Awards ==
Year	Nominee / work	Category	Result
2009	The Ladies No. 1 Detective Agency	Best Actress Drama Series	Nominated

== Soul Train Music Awards ==
Year	Nominee / work	Category	Result
Soul Train Music Awards
2001	Herself	Best R&B/Soul or Rap New Artist	Nominated
2001	"Gettin' In the Way"	Best R&B/Soul Single, Female	Nominated
2001	Who Is Jill Scott? Words and Sounds Vol. 1	Best R&B/Soul Album, Female	Won
2005	"Golden"	Best R&B/Soul Single Female,	Nominated
2005	Beautifully Human: Words and Sounds Vol. 2	Best R&B/Soul Album, Female	Nominated
2011	Herself	Best R&B/Soul, Female	Won
2011	The Light of the Sun	Best R&B/Soul Album, Female	Won
Soul Train Lady of Soul Awards
2001	"A Long Walk"	Best R&B/Soul Single, Solo	Won
2001	Herself	Best R&B/Soul or Rap New Artist	Won
2001	Who Is Jill Scott? Words and Sounds Vol. 1	Best R&B/Soul Soul Album, Solo	Won
2001	Who Is Jill Scott? Words and Sounds Vol. 1	Album of the Year	Won
2005	Beautifully Human: Words and Sounds Vol. 2	Best R&B/Soul Album, Solo	Nominated

== Vibe Awards ==
Year	Nominee / work	Category	Result
2004	Herself	R&B Voice of the Year	Nominated
