= The Real Thing Tour =

2008 concert tour by Jill Scott

- Tour by Jill Scott
- Promotional poster for tour
- Associated album: The Real Thing: Words and Sounds Vol. 3
- Start date: February 5, 2008
- End date: August 28, 2008
- Legs: 5
- No. of shows: 55 in North America; 8 in Europe; 63 Total

Jill Scott concert chronology
- Sugar Water Festival (2005); The Real Thing World Tour (2008); Maxwell & Jill Scott: The Tour (2010)

The Real Thing Tour (also known as The Real Thing: An Evening with Jill Scott) is the fifth concert tour by American recording artist, Jill Scott. Visiting North America and Europe, the tour promoted the singer's third studio album, The Real Thing: Words and Sounds Vol. 3. The trek yielded the singer's first concert special for TV One entitled, Jill Scott: The Real Thing Tour (Live in Philly). The tour featured singers Raheem DeVaughn and Bilal as opening acts.

== Background ==
Stemming from the success of her album, Scott announced the tour through her website in December 2007 with 17 dates. In January, additional dates were released. Opening for Scott on tour was fellow neo soul singer, Raheem DeVaughn. To coincide with the tour, Hidden Beach decided to release the singer's second live album, Jill Scott: Live in Paris+. Filmed and recorded at the historic Élysée Montmartre, the CD/DVD package contains selected tracks from Scott's 2004 European tour. Additionally, it contains four new tracks from her current album, performed during her U.S. promotional tour. During the stint of the tour, Scott received a Grammy Award for Daydreamin'.

The singer Bilal also joined the tour as an opening act, in the midst of his own period of touring in the aftermath of his unreleased but leaked second album Love for Sale. His live band included pianist Robert Glasper, bassist Conley "Tone" Whitfield, and drummer Chris "Daddy" Dave.

The trek originally concluded in March 2008, however, Scott added additional dates in the United States during the summer, along with festival appearances in Europe. Once the tour was complete, Scott returned to Botswana to film the series The No. 1 Ladies' Detective Agency.

== Opening acts ==
- Raheem DeVaughn (North America—Leg 1)
- Bilal (North America—Leg 2)

== Set list ==
North America (Set I)

February 5 – March 30

1. "Let It Be" (Instrumental Interlude)
2. "The Real Thing"
3. "Gimme"
4. "Cross My Mind"
5. "Honey Molasses"
6. "Come See Me"
7. "Crown Royal"
8. "A Long Walk" (contains elements of "Everybody Loves the Sunshine")
9. "Only You"
10. "Whenever You're Around"
11. "How It Make You Feel"
12. "My Love"
13. "Wanna Be Loved"
14. "The Fact Is (I Need You)" (contains elements of "Send For Me")
15. "Not Like Crazy"
16. "Epiphany" (contains elements of "This Place Hotel")
17. "Slowly Surely" (contains elements of "Stakes Is High")
18. "Golden"
19. "Hate on Me"
20. "It's Love" (contains elements of "Crank That (Soulja Boy)")

Encore

21. "The Way"
22. "He Loves Me (Lyzel in E Flat)"
23. "And I Heard...(Do You Understand)"
North America/Europe (Set II)

June 18 – August 28

1. "Rightness"
2. "Let It Be"
3. "The Real Thing"
4. "A Long Walk"
5. "Epiphany"
6. "Insomnia"
7. "Only You"
8. "Whenever You're Around"
9. "Slowly Surely"
10. "The Way"
11. "How It Make You Feel"
12. "Do You Remember"
13. "Come See Me"
14. "Imagination (Crown Royal Suite)"
15. "Gimme"
16. "It's Love"

Encore

17. "Golden"
18. "Hate On Me"
19. "He Loves Me (Lyzel In E Flat)"
20. "And I Heard...(Do You Understand)"

== Tour dates ==
Date	City	Country	Venue
North America—Leg 1
February 5, 2008	Seattle	United States	Paramount Theatre
February 7, 2008	Oakland	United States	Paramount Theatre
February 8, 2008	Oakland	United States	Paramount Theatre
February 12, 2008	Anaheim	United States	The Grove of Anaheim
February 14, 2008	Los Angeles	United States	Gibson Amphitheatre
February 16, 2008	Phoenix	United States	Dodge Theatre
February 19, 2008	Grand Prairie	United States	Nokia Theatre at Grand Prairie
February 20, 2008	Houston	United States	Verizon Wireless Theater
February 22, 2008	Atlanta	United States	Fox Theatre
February 23, 2008	Atlanta	United States	Fox Theatre
February 26, 2008	Baltimore	United States	Lyric Opera House
February 27, 2008	Baltimore	United States	Lyric Opera House
February 28, 2008	Norfolk	United States	Chrysler Hall
March 2, 2008	Greensboro	United States	War Memorial Auditorium
March 3, 2008	Greensboro	United States	War Memorial Auditorium
March 5, 2008	Newark	United States	Prudential Hall
March 6, 2008	Newark	United States	Prudential Hall
March 7, 2008	Philadelphia	United States	Liacouras Center
March 9, 2008	Boston	United States	Orpheum Theatre
March 11, 2008	Washington, D.C.	United States	DAR Constitution Hall
March 12, 2008	Washington, D.C.	United States	DAR Constitution Hall
March 14, 2008	Washington, D.C.	United States	DAR Constitution Hall
March 15, 2008	Washington, D.C.	United States	DAR Constitution Hall
March 16, 2008	Richmond	United States	Landmark Theater
March 19, 2008	Pittsburgh	United States	Benedum Center
March 21, 2008	Detroit	United States	Fox Theatre
March 22, 2008	Chicago	United States	Chicago Theatre
March 23, 2008	Chicago	United States	Chicago Theatre
March 25, 2008	Indianapolis	United States	Murat Theater
March 26, 2008	St. Louis	United States	Fox Theatre
March 28, 2008	Memphis	United States	Orpheum Theatre
March 29, 2008	Memphis	United States	Orpheum Theatre
March 30, 2008	Birmingham	United States	Boutwell Memorial Auditorium
North America—Leg 2
June 18, 2008	Bridgeport	United States	Klein Memorial Auditorium
June 20, 2008^{[A]}	New York City	United States	Carnegie Hall
June 28, 2008^{[B]}	Hampton	United States	Hampton Coliseum
June 29, 2008	Charlotte	United States	Ovens Auditorium
July 1, 2008	Nashville	United States	Jackson Hall
July 3, 2008	Houston	United States	Verizon Wireless Theater
July 4, 2008^{[C]}	New Orleans	United States	Louisiana Superdome
Europe
July 9, 2008	Warsaw	Poland	Congress Hall
July 11, 2008^{[D]}	Rotterdam	Netherlands	Rotterdam Ahoy
July 12, 2008^{[E]}	Montreux	Switzerland	Miles Davis Hall
July 14, 2008	Antwerp	Belgium	Openluchttheater Rivierenhof
July 15, 2008	Paris	France	Le Grand Rex
July 18, 2008	London	England	Brixton Academy
July 20, 2008	Amsterdam	Netherlands	Paradiso
July 22, 2008^{[F]}	Monte Carlo	Monaco	Salle des Étoiles
North America—Leg 3
July 26, 2008^{[G]}	Cincinnati	United States	Paul Brown Stadium
July 27, 2008^{[H]}	Detroit	United States	Chene Park Amphitheater
July 30, 2008	Atlanta	United States	Chastain Park Amphitheater
August 2, 2008^{[I]}	Columbia	United States	Merriweather Post Pavilion
August 3, 2008	Atlantic City	United States	Borgata Events Center
August 7, 2008	Kansas City	United States	Starlight Theatre
August 8, 2008	Chicago	United States	Charter One Pavilion
August 9, 2008	Cleveland	United States	Allen Theatre
August 11, 2008^{[J]}	New York City	United States	Wingate Field
August 15, 2008	New York City	United States	Highline Ballroom
August 26, 2008	San Francisco	United States	Yoshi's Jazz Club
August 27, 2008	San Francisco	United States	Yoshi's Jazz Club
August 28, 2008	San Francisco	United States	Yoshi's Jazz Club

Festivals and other miscellaneous performances

^{A} This concert was a part of the "JVC Jazz Festival"
^{B} This concert was a part of the "Hampton Jazz Festival"
^{C} This concert was a part of the "Essence Music Festival"
^{D} This concert was a part of the "North Sea Jazz Festival"
^{E} This concert was a part of the "Montreux Jazz Festival"

^{F} This concert was a part of the "Sporting Summer Festival"
^{G} This concert was a part of the "Macy's Music Festival"
^{H} This concert was a part of the "Classic Soul Series"
^{I} This concert was a part of the "Summer Spirit Concert Series"
^{J} This concert was a part of the "Martin Luther King, Jr. Concert Series"

Cancellations and rescheduled shows

August 12, 2008	New York City	Central Park SummerStage	Cancelled

=== Box office score data ===
Venue	City	Tickets Sold / available	Gross Revenue
Paramount Theatre	Oakland	5,654 / 6,030 (94%)	$352,490
Gibson Amphitheatre	Los Angeles	5,654 / 5,987 (94%)	$296,675
Dodge Theatre	Phoenix	2,626 / 3,770 (70%)	$139,062
Nokia Theatre at Grand Prairie	Grand Prairie	4,868 / 4,868 (100%)	$262,374
Verizon Wireless Theater	Houston	4,988 / 4,988 (100%)	$284,531
Fox Theatre	Atlanta	8,852 / 8,852 (100%)	$551,325
Prudential Hall	Newark	4,795 / 5,370 (89%)	$354,785
Liacouras Center	Philadelphia	7,412 / 7,575 (98%)	$366,622
Orpheum Theatre	Boston	2,640 / 2,749 (96%)	$121,520
Fox Theatre	Detroit	4,793 / 4,839 (99%)	$299,865
Chicago Theatre	Chicago	7,082 / 7,082 (100%)	$418,659
Murat Theater	Indianapolis	2,513 / |2,513 (100%)	$125,427
Merriweather Post Pavilion	Columbia	12,237 / 15,000 (81%)	$634,332
Charter One Pavilion	Chicago	4,771 / 7,290 (65%)	$263,545
Allen Theatre	Cleveland	2,362 / 2,504 (94%)	$143,398
TOTAL		81,247 / 89,417 (91%)	$4,614,610

== Broadcasts and recordings ==
The tour was recorded for a concert special on the U.S. based TV One. The special, Jill Scott: The Real Thing Tour (Live in Philly), was filmed in Scott's hometown of Philadelphia at the Liacouras Center. For a crowd of over seven thousand, Scott performed tracks from her newest album, along with her greatest hits. The special aired June 29, 2008.

== Personnel ==
Crew

- Lighting Designer: Martin Thomas
- Lighting Crew Chief: Wayne Bukovinsky
- Lighting Technician: Dylan Haines
- Musical Director: Noel Terrell
