= Sugar Water Festival =

Music festival

- Tour by Erykah Badu, Queen Latifah, Jill Scott
- Promotional poster for festival
- Associated albums: The Dana Owens Album; Worldwide Underground; Beautifully Human
- Start date: July 8, 2005
- End date: August 13, 2006
- Legs: 2
- No. of shows: 24 in North America
Erykah Badu tour chronology
Worldwide Underground Tour (2004)	Sugar Water Festival (2005–06)	Summer Tour (2006)
Queen Latifah tour chronology
Sugar Water Festival (2005–06)	Trav'lin' Light Tour (2007)
Jill Scott tour chronology
Big Beautiful Tour (2005)	Sugar Water Festival (2005–06)	The Real Thing Tour (2008)

The Sugar Water Festival was a music festival founded by American recording artists Erykah Badu, Queen Latifah and Jill Scott. The trek played to amphitheaters and arenas in the United States during the summer of 2005 and 2006. It began in 2005 as an event to bring awareness to health issues to African-American women. British duo Floetry opened shows during the 2005 run. The festival was relaunched briefly in 2006 with Kelis opening the show and comedian Mo'Nique hosting the festival. 2006 was the final year for the outing. The festival had plans to expand into Europe and Asia; however, this did not come to fruition.

== Background ==
The festival was announced in May 2005. Forming the "Suger Water Festival, LLC, the trek was headlined by Badu, Latifah and Scott. The singers stated performing Lilith Fair was the inspiration for the outing—with each singer wanting to bring a specific message to African American women. The festival was planned within six months, not providing enough times to gain notable sponsors. Badu says the meaning behind the name is the symbolism of "water" to "Earth", as the planet is three-fourths water. She continues to say women are the sweetness to the water, giving them the name of the tour."

To introduce the shows, Badu stated:

The Sugar Water Festival is much more than a concert tour", said Badu. "It's about educating, enlightening and entertaining. Queen, Jill and I are all committed to tapping into the communities we play—to raise awareness, in a positive way, of what we can all do to create a better world.

== Opening acts ==
- Floetry (2005)
- Kelis (2006)

== Set list ==
- For the 2005 outing, the set list included an opening performance by, Scott, Latifah and Badu performing "Night's Over Egypt" and closing finale, "Never Too Much" as a tribute to R&B/soul singer Luther Vandross.
2005
1. "Nights Over Egypt"

Queen Latifah

2. "Baby Get Lost"
3. "Hard Times"
4. "Hello Stranger"
5. "The Same Love That Made Me Laugh"
6. "California Dreamin'"
7. "Simply Beautiful"
8. "Latifah's Had it up 2 Here"
9. "Just Another Day..."
10. "Ladies First"
11. "U.N.I.T.Y."

Jill Scott

12. "Golden"
13. "The Way"
14. "Do You Remember"
15. "Gettin' In the Way"
16. "Cross My Mind"
17. "A Long Walk"
18. "Whatever"
19. "He Loves Me (Lyzel In E Flat)"

Erykah Badu

20. "Rimshot (Intro)" (Instrumental Interlude)
21. "Green Eyes"
22. "Didn't Cha Know?"
23. "Cleva"
24. "Orange Moon"
25. "Love of My Life (An Ode to Hip-Hop)"
26. "Otherside of the Game"
27. "Danger"
28. Medley: "On & On" / "...& On"
29. "Back in the Day (Puff)"
30. "Bag Lady"

Encore

31. "Never Too Much"
2006

Jill Scott

1. "Exclusively"
2. "The Way
3. "Cross My Mind"
4. "Bedda at Home"
5. "Whatever"
6. "A Long Walk"
7. "Golden"
8. "The Fact Is (I Need You)"
9. "He Loves Me (Lyzel in E Flat)"

Queen Latifah

10. "Mercy, Mercy, Mercy"
11. "If I Had You"
12. "California Dreamin'"
13. "Simply Beautiful"
14. "Lush Life"
15. "A Good Woman"
16. "Just Another Day..."
17. "Come into My House"
18. "Ladies First"
19. "U.N.I.T.Y."

Erykah Badu

20. "I Want You"
21. Medley: "On & On" / "...& On"
22. "Next Lifetime"
23. "Tyrone"
24. "Back in the Day (Puff)"
25. "Otherside of the Game"
26. "Kiss Me on My Neck (Hesi)"
27. "Cleva"
28. "Green Eyes"
29. "Love of My Life (An Ode to Hip-Hop)" (contains elements of "Rapper's Delight")
30. "Danger"
31. "Bag Lady"

== Tour dates ==
Date	City	Country	Venue
North America—Leg 1
July 8, 2005	Virginia Beach	United States	Verizon Wireless Amphitheater
July 9, 2005	Columbia	United States	Merriweather Post Pavilion
July 12, 2005	Wantagh	United States	Tommy Hilfiger at Jones Beach Theater
July 13, 2005	Boston	United States	Bank of America Pavilion
July 15, 2005	Holmdel	United States	PNC Bank Arts Center
July 16, 2005	Camden	United States	Tweeter Center at the Waterfront
July 17, 2005	Uncasville	United States	Mohegan Sun Arena
July 21, 2005	Atlanta	United States	Chastain Park Amphitheater
July 22, 2005	Atlanta	United States	Chastain Park Amphitheater
July 23, 2005	Charlotte	United States	Verizon Wireless Amphitheatre
July 26, 2005	Clarkston	United States	DTE Energy Music Theatre
July 27, 2005	Toronto	Canada	Air Canada Centre
July 29, 2005	Chicago	United States	Lakefront Pavilion
July 30, 2005	Columbus	United States	Germain Amphitheater
July 31, 2005	Maryland Heights	United States	UMB Bank Pavilion
August 2, 2005	Greenwood Village	United States	Fiddler's Green Amphitheatre
August 4, 2005	Concord	United States	Chronicle Pavilion
August 6, 2005	Paradise	United States	Mandalay Bay Events Center
August 9, 2005	Los Angeles	United States	Greek Theatre
August 10, 2005	Los Angeles	United States	Greek Theatre
North America—Leg 2
August 3, 2006	Grand Prairie	United States	Nokia Theatre at Grand Prairie
August 5, 2006	Atlanta	United States	Chastain Park Amphitheater
August 12, 2006	New York City	United States	Prospect Park Bandshell
August 13, 2006	Columbia	United States	Merriweather Post Pavilion

== Additional notes ==
- During the August 13, 2006 show in Columbia, Maryland, Scott along with Latifah and MoNique performed with Badu on her closing finale, "Bag Lady".
