= Big Beautiful Tour =

2005 concert tour by Jill Scott

- Tour by Jill Scott
- Associated album: Beautifully Human: Words and Sounds Vol. 2
- Start date: February 9, 2005
- End date: March 26, 2005
- Legs: 2
- No. of shows: 24 in North America; 24 in total

Jill Scott concert chronology
- Buzz Tour (2004); Big Beautiful Tour (2005); Sugar Water Festival (2005)

Big Beautiful Tour was a concert tour in by American R&B recording artist Jill Scott, in support of her album Beautifully Human: Words and Sounds Vol. 2. The tour started on February 9, and ended on March 26, in Upper Darby, PA. Scott's performance received rave reviews from critics attending the shows. Jill blended a mixed sound of R&B, soul-funk, hip-hop and poetry, while delivering her hits "Golden", "A Long Walk", "The Way" and the 2005 Grammy Award-winning song "Cross My Mind".

== Opening acts ==
- Common
- Raphael Saadiq (select dates)

== Set list ==
1. "Jilltro" (Intro Suite)
2. "Warm Up"/"It's Love" (Mashup Mix)
3. "Golden" (Remix)
4. "A Long Walk"
5. "Exclusively"
6. "Gettin' In the Way"
7. "He Loves Me (Lyzel in E Flat)"
8. "Talk To Me"
9. "Cross My Mind"
10. "Bedda At Home" (Acapella)
11. "Whatever"
12. "Can't Explain (42nd Street Happenstance)"
13. "The Fact Is (I Need You)"
14. "One Is The Magic #"
15. "Slowly Surely"
16. "Not Like Crazy"
17. "The Way"

Notes

- On select dates of the tour, opening act hip-hop star Common would ask Scott to appear on stage to perform their R&B/funk infused dance duet, "I Am Music", from his platinum-selling album Electric Circus.

== Tour dates ==
Date	City	Country	Venue
North America
February 9, 2005	Sacramento	United States	Memorial Auditorium
February 10, 2005	Oakland	United States	Paramount Theatre
February 11, 2005	Oakland	United States	Paramount Theatre
February 14, 2005	Los Angeles	United States	Universal Amphitheatre
February 17, 2005	San Diego	United States	Copley Symphony Hall
February 20, 2005	Denver	United States	Paramount Theatre
February 22, 2005	Grand Prairie	United States	Nokia Theatre at Grand Prairie
February 23, 2005	Houston	United States	Verizon Wireless Theater
February 25, 2005	Memphis	United States	Orpheum Theatre
February 26, 2005	New Orleans	United States	Saenger Theater
February 28, 2005	Nashville	United States	Ryman Auditorium
March 2, 2005	Atlanta	United States	Fox Theatre
March 3, 2005	Greensboro	United States	Greensboro Coliseum Complex
March 4, 2005	New York City	United States	Radio City Music Hall
March 5, 2005	New York City	United States	Radio City Music Hall
March 8, 2005	Richmond	United States	Landmark Theater
March 9, 2005	Washington, D.C.	United States	DAR Constitution Hall
March 10, 2005	Washington, D.C.	United States	DAR Constitution Hall
March 13, 2005	Boston	United States	Orpheum Theatre
March 16, 2005	Toronto	Canada	Massey Hall
March 19, 2005	Chicago	United States	Chicago Theatre
March 20, 2005	Pittsburgh	United States	Byham Theater
March 23, 2005	Cleveland	United States	State Theatre
March 24, 2005	Baltimore	United States	Joseph Meyerhoff Symphony Hall
March 26, 2005	Upper Darby Township	United States	Tower Theater
