= Live in Paris+ =

Live album by Jill Scott
- Released: February 5, 2008
- Recorded: November 2004, Paris, France; October 2007, Los Angeles, CA
- Genre: R&B; soul; neo soul
- Length: 134:43
- Label: Hidden Beach
- Producer: Jill Scott, Steve McKeever; Thianar Gomis (Executive producer)

Jill Scott chronology
| The Real Thing: Words and Sounds Vol. 3 (2007) | Live in Paris+ (2008) | The Light of the Sun (2011) |

Live in Paris+ is a live CD/DVD album by American R&B/soul singer–songwriter/actress Jill Scott, released in the United States on February 5, 2008 by Hidden Beach Recordings. The release was a two-disc set, containing an audio CD and a DVD. Disc one is a live DVD, featuring two concerts, a concert recorded at the Elysee Montmartre in Paris, France during her 2004 Buzz Tour and the "+" in title refers to a live recorded concert in 2007 at House of Blues in Los Angeles, CA. Disc two is Paris+ audio CD of the concert. Live in Paris+ was certified Gold a month after its release.

== Track listing ==
=== Disc One (DVD) ===
Live in Paris 2004

1. "The Way" (J. Scott, Harris) – 8:16
2. "Whatever" (J. Scott, R. "Pnutt" Frost) - 7:33
3. "The Fact Is (I Need You)" (Scott, Kuzma) – 7:11
4. "Golden" (J. Scott, A. Bell) – 13:00
5. "My Petition" (J. Scott, A. Harris, V. Davis) – 6:01
6. "Rasool" (J. Scott, A. Harris, Davis, T. Brock, P. Taylor, Barry White) – 8:27
7. "Bedda At Home" (J. Scott, I. Barias, C. Haggins, F. Romano, J. Smith) – 6:00
8. "He Loves Me (Lyzel In E Flat)" (J. Scott, Keith Pelzer) – 11:01

Live in Los Angeles 2007

1. "Crown Royal" (J. Scott, L. Hutson Jr.) – 7:36
2. "Hate on Me" (J. Scott, A Blackstone, S McKie) – 8:26
3. "My Love" (J. Scott, A. Blackstone, S. Mckie) – 2:15
4. "All I" (J. Scott, A. Blackstone) – 9:02

=== Disc Two (CD) ===
1. "The Way" – 8:16
2. "Whatever" – 7:33
3. "The Fact Is (I Need You)" – 7:11
4. "Golden" – 13:00
5. "My Petition" – 06:01
6. "Rasool" – 8:27
7. "Bedda At Home" – 6:00
8. "He Loves Me (Lyzel In E Flat)" – 11:11

=== Certifications ===
| Country | Certifier | Certification | Sales |
|---|---|---|---|
| United States | RIAA | Gold | |
