= The Real Thing: Words and Sounds Vol. 3 =

Studio album by Jill Scott
- Released: September 25, 2007
- Recorded: 2005–2007
- Studio: The House That Quest Built (Note: Track 1); The Studio (Philadelphia) (Note: Track 12; vocals on track 1); 609 (Philadelphia) (Note: Track 2); Sigma Sound (Philadelphia) (Note: Tracks 3, 7 and 13); Keswick (Reseda, California) (Note: Tracks 4, 11 and 14); Glenwood Place (Glendale, California) (Note: Additional recording on track 4); Atlantis (Hollywood, California) (Note: Tracks 5 and 11); Kush (Miami Beach, Florida) (Note: Track 6); Bazz (Note: Track 8); Currie House (Maplewood, Minnesota) (Note: Track 9); Headquarters (Philadelphia) (Note: Track 10); The Cosmic Dust Recorders (Los Angeles) (Note: Track 15)
- Genre: Neo soul
- Length: 50:39
- Label: Hidden Beach
- Producer: Abduology; Adam Blackstone; Randy Bowland; Vidal Davis; Andre Harris; Shafiq Husayn; JR Hutson; Om'Mas Keith; Khari Mateen; Steve McKie; Jesse Owenz; Jill Scott; Omari Shabazz; Stokley; Scott Storch

Jill Scott chronology
Collaborations (2007)	The Real Thing: Words and Sounds Vol. 3 (2007)	Live in Paris+ (2008)

Alternative cover
- Deluxe limited edition cover

Singles from The Real Thing: Words and Sounds Vol. 3
- 1. "Hate On Me" Released: August 2007; 2. "My Love" Released: November 2007; 3. "Whenever You're Around" Released: 2008

The Real Thing: Words and Sounds Vol. 3 is the third studio album by American singer Jill Scott, released on September 25, 2007, by Hidden Beach Recordings. It received positive reviews from music critics.

On certain editions of the album, recordings of live performances of "Golden" and "The Fact Is (I Need You)" are included as bonus tracks. A deluxe limited edition of The Real Thing: Words and Sounds Vol. 3 was also released, containing a bonus DVD. On March 17, 2009, the album was certified gold by the Recording Industry Association of America (RIAA). It was Scott's last release on Hidden Beach Recordings before her departure from the label in 2010. This is also the final installment of the Words and Sounds series.

== Background ==
In an interview with HitQuarters, producer JR Hutson commented on the creation of the song "Whenever You're Around":

"I tried to take a real Quincy Jones approach to that record. I brought in a lot of musicians and we were just vibing to a few different things, and that was one of the tracks that stood out to me in the jam session that day. So I [...] tweaked and tweaked the track, edited it [...] and reformatted it, and then eventually ended up with that track."

== Commercial performance ==
In the United States, the album debuted at number four on the Billboard 200 and number two on Billboard's Top R&B/Hip-Hop Albums chart, selling 148,000 copies in its first week. Scott's second highest debut on both charts after 2004's Beautifully Human: Words and Sounds Vol. 2. The album was certified gold by the Recording Industry Association of America (RIAA) on March 17, 2009, and by April 2011, it had sold 663,000 copies in the US alone. Elsewhere, The Real Thing: Words and Sounds Vol. 3 charted at number 65 in the Netherlands, number 75 in the United Kingdom, and number 128 in France.

== Singles ==
Lead single "Hate On Me" is an unusual song for Scott, stepping out of her soft and smooth soul style and into a bigger, jazzier, more sassy style. In the album sampler, Scott says it is addressed to a group of people she found online who were "hating on her". Amber Riley's character Mercedes Jones performed the song on the Glee episode titled "Throwdown", aired October 14, 2009. "My Love" was released as the second single, for which a music video premiered on September 2, 2007. The third and final single was "Whenever You're Around" and features George Duke. While there was no video shot, the promotional single was successful at R&B radio stations, reaching number 56 on the Hot R&B/Hip-Hop Songs chart and number 16 on the Hot Adult R&B Airplay chart.

== Critical reception ==
Professional ratings
Aggregate scores
Source	Rating
Metacritic	79/100
Review scores
Source	Rating
About.com	4/5 stars
AllMusic	4/5 stars
The Guardian	4/5 stars
Mojo	4/5 stars
MSN Music (Consumer Guide)	A−
Q	3/5 stars
Rolling Stone	3.5/5 stars
Slant Magazine	3/5 stars
Sputnikmusic	3.5/5
Uncut	4/5 stars

The Real Thing: Words and Sounds Vol. 3 received generally positive reviews from music critics. At Metacritic, which assigns a normalized rating out of 100 to reviews from mainstream critics, the album received an average score of 79, based on 11 reviews. Uncut magazine commended Scott's funky sensibilities and attempt to expand on the "tempo-and libido" of her 2004 album Beautifully Human: Words and Sounds Vol. 2. Mojo called the album "her most intense, but perhaps also her most pleasurable excursion yet." In his review for MSN Music, Robert Christgau said that Scott substantiates the songs' sexual content through her phrasing, timbre, and lyrics about physical pleasure, and that the album is musically consistent because of "a contour and a groove that suits its well-inhabited breakup concept."

== Track listing ==
No.	Title	Writer(s)	Producer(s)	Length
1.	"Let It Be"	Jill Scott; Khari Mateen	Mateen	1:50
2.	"The Real Thing"	Scott; Andre Harris; Vidal Davis; Ryan Toby	Harris; Davis	3:25
3.	"Hate On Me"	Scott; Adam Blackstone; Steve McKie	Blackstone	3:29
4.	"Come See Me"	Scott; Lee Hutson Jr.	JR Hutson	4:59
5.	"Crown Royal"	Scott; Hutson	Hutson	1:48
6.	"Epiphany"	Scott; Scott Storch	Storch	2:31
7.	"My Love"	Scott; Blackstone; McKie	Blackstone; McKie^{[a]}	3:50
8.	"Insomnia"	Scott; Omari Shabazz	Shabazz	3:55
9.	"How It Make You Feel"	Scott; Stokley Williams	Stokley	4:32
10.	"Only You"	Scott; Tyrone Goldstein II	Abduology; Jesse Owenz; C. Harris^{[a]}; C. "Spaun" Reeves^{[a]}; J. Gold^{[a]}	3:35
11.	"Whenever You're Around" (featuring George Duke)	Scott; Hutson	Hutson	4:07
12.	"Celibacy Blues"	Scott; Blackstone; Randy Bowland	Scott; Blackstone; Bowland	2:15
13.	"All I"	Scott; Blackstone	Blackstone	4:56
14.	"Wanna Be Loved"	Scott; Hutson	Hutson	3:22
15.	"Breathe"	Scott; Om'Mas Keith; Shafiq Husayn	Keith; Husayn	2:06

Best Buy edition bonus tracks
No.	Title	Writer(s)	Length
16.	"The Way" (live in Paris)	Scott; Harris	8:19
17.	"Whatever" (live in Paris)	Scott; Ronald "PNutt" Frost	7:32

iTunes Store deluxe edition bonus tracks
No.	Title	Writer(s)	Length
16.	"Imagination/Crown Royal Suite"	Scott; Hutson	5:50
17.	"Rightness"	Scott	3:40
18.	"Golden" (live)	Scott; Anthony Bell	10:08
19.	"The Fact Is (I Need You)" (live)	Scott; Pete Kuzma	6:40

French edition bonus tracks
No.	Title	Writer(s)	Length
16.	"Golden" (live)	Scott; Bell	10:08
17.	"The Fact Is (I Need You)" (live)	Scott; Kuzma	6:40

Japanese edition bonus tracks
No.	Title	Writer(s)	Length
16.	"Imagination/Crown Royal Suite"	Scott; Hutson	5:50
17.	"Rightness"	Scott	3:40
18.	"Bedda at Home" (live in Paris)	Scott; Ivan Barias; Carvin Haggins; Frank Romano; Johnnie Smith	8:32
19.	"Hate on Me" (music video)

Deluxe limited edition bonus tracks
No.	Title	Writer(s)	Length
16.	"Imagination/Crown Royal Suite"	Scott; Hutson	5:48
17.	"Rightness"	Scott; Harris; Davis	3:40

Deluxe limited edition bonus DVD
No.	Title	Length
1.	"A Long Walk" (music video)	4:13
2.	"Golden" (music video)	3:48
3.	"Cross My Mind" (music video)	4:44
4.	"Hate on Me" (music video)	3:31
5.	"My Love" (music video)	4:15
6.	"The Reel from the Real Jill Scott: An Intimate Conversation with Jill"	15:12

=== Notes ===
- ^{^[a]} signifies a co-producer

== Charts ==
=== Weekly charts ===
Weekly chart performance for The Real Thing: Words and Sounds Vol. 3
Chart (2007)	Peak position
Canadian Albums (Nielsen SoundScan)	99
Dutch Albums (Album Top 100)	65
French Albums (SNEP)	128
UK Albums (OCC)	79
UK R&B Albums (OCC)	10
US Billboard 200	4
US Top R&B/Hip-Hop Albums (Billboard)	2

=== Year-end charts ===
2007 year-end chart performance for The Real Thing: Words and Sounds Vol. 3
Chart (2007)	Position
US Billboard 200	148
US Top R&B/Hip-Hop Albums (Billboard)	34

2008 year-end chart performance for The Real Thing: Words and Sounds Vol. 3
Chart (2008)	Position
US Top R&B/Hip-Hop Albums (Billboard)	34

== Certifications ==
Certifications for The Real Thing: Words and Sounds Vol. 3
Region	Certification	Certified units/sales
United States (RIAA)	Gold	500,000^{^}
^{^} Shipments figures based on certification alone.
