= Collaborations (Jill Scott album) =

Compilation album by Jill Scott
- Released: January 30, 2007
- Genre: R&B; soul; neo soul; alternative hip hop
- Label: Hidden Beach
- Producer: Junius Bervine; Bobby Colomby; Vidal Davis; Andre Harris; Darren Henson; Jay Dee; Jimmy Jam and Terry Lewis; Craig Kallman; James Poyser; Soulquarians; Jeff Townes; will.i.am; James "Big Jim" Wright

Jill Scott chronology
Beautifully Human: Words and Sounds Vol. 2 (2004)	Collaborations (2007)	The Real Thing: Words and Sounds Vol. 3 (2007)

Professional ratings
Review scores
Source	Rating
About.com	3/5 stars
AllMusic	3.5/5 stars
Robert Christgau	(3-star Honorable Mention)
Dallas Observer	Mixed
Entertainment Weekly	B−
PopMatters	4/10
USA Today	3.5/4 stars

Collaborations is a compilation album by American singer Jill Scott, released on January 30, 2007, by Hidden Beach Recordings. The album consists of past collaborations between Scott and other artists, in addition to two remixes of "Love Rain" featuring Mos Def. The CD release is accompanied by a Hidden Beach sampler including two Scott songs, "In Stereo" and the live version of "The Fact Is (I Need You)".

== Track listing ==
No.	Title	Writer(s)	Original album	Length
1.	"Love Rain" (Head Nod Remix) (featuring Mos Def)	Jill Scott; Vidal Davis	Who Is Jill Scott? Words and Sounds Vol. 1, 2000	5:02
2.	"Daydreamin'" (featuring Lupe Fiasco)	Lupe Fiasco; Craig Kallman; Dave Mackay; Sylvain Vanholme; Raymond Vincent	Food & Liquor, 2006	3:47
3.	"Good Morning Heartache" (featuring Chris Botti)	Irene Higginbotham; Ervin Drake; Dan Fisher	To Love Again: The Duets, 2005	6:10
4.	"Said Enough" (featuring the Isley Brothers)	Scott; Andre Harris	Eternal, 2001	5:02
5.	"One Time" (featuring Eric Roberson)	Scott; Davis; Roberson	Down to Earth, 2001	3:51
6.	"Let Me" (featuring Sérgio Mendes and will.i.am)	Baden Powell; Norman Gimbel	Timeless, 2006	4:02
7.	"8 Minutes to Sunrise" (featuring Common)	Lonnie Lynn; Scott; Harris	Wild Wild West, 1999	4:26
8.	"Funky for You" (featuring Common and Bilal)	Lynn; James Yancey; James Poyser; Bilal Oliver	Like Water for Chocolate, 2000	5:51
9.	"Sometimes I Wonder" (featuring Darius Rucker)	Scott; Darius Rucker; Harris; Davis; Aja Graydon	Back to Then, 2002	4:11
10.	"Slide" (featuring Jeff Bradshaw)	Scott; Jeff Bradshaw; Junius Bervine	Bone Deep, 2003	4:21
11.	"The Rain" (featuring Will Smith)	Deniece Williams; William Neale; Smith; Lynn; Scott; Jeff Townes; Darren Henson	Willennium, 1999	4:33
12.	"God Bless the Child" (featuring Al Jarreau and George Benson)	Billie Holiday; Arthur Herzog Jr.	Givin' It Up, 2006	3:37
13.	"Kingdom Come" (featuring Kirk Franklin)	Franklin	Kingdom Come, 2001	4:28
14.	"Love Rain" (Coffee Shop Mix) (featuring Mos Def)	Scott; Davis	Who Is Jill Scott? Words and Sounds Vol. 1	4:16

== Personnel ==
Credits adapted from the liner notes of Collaborations.

- Jill Scott – vocals (all tracks)
- Vidal Davis – production (tracks 1, 4, 5, 9, 14); additional production (track 7)
- Craig Kallman – production (track 2)
- I Monster – additional production (track 2)
- Bobby Colomby – production (track 3)
- Andre Harris – production (tracks 4, 7, 9)
- will.i.am – production (track 6)
- Jay Dee – production (track 8)
- James Poyser – production (track 8)
- Junius Bervine – production (track 10)
- Jeff Townes – production (track 11)
- Darren "Limitless" Henson – production (track 11)
- John Burk – production (track 12)
- Kirk Franklin – production (track 13)

== Charts ==
=== Weekly charts ===
Weekly chart performance for Collaborations
Chart (2007)	Peak position
US Billboard 200	12
US Top R&B/Hip-Hop Albums (Billboard)	3

=== Year-end charts ===
Year-end chart performance for Collaborations
Chart (2007)	Position
US Top R&B/Hip-Hop Albums (Billboard)	79
