= Just Before Dawn =

Just Before Dawn may refer to:

- Just Before Dawn (1946 film), an American crime film directed by William Castle
- Just Before Dawn (1981 film), an American slasher film directed by Jeff Lieberman
- The Original Jill Scott from the Vault, Vol. 1 (working title: Just Before Dawn: Jill Scott from the Vault, Vol. 1), a 2011 album by Jill Scott
