= JR Hutson =

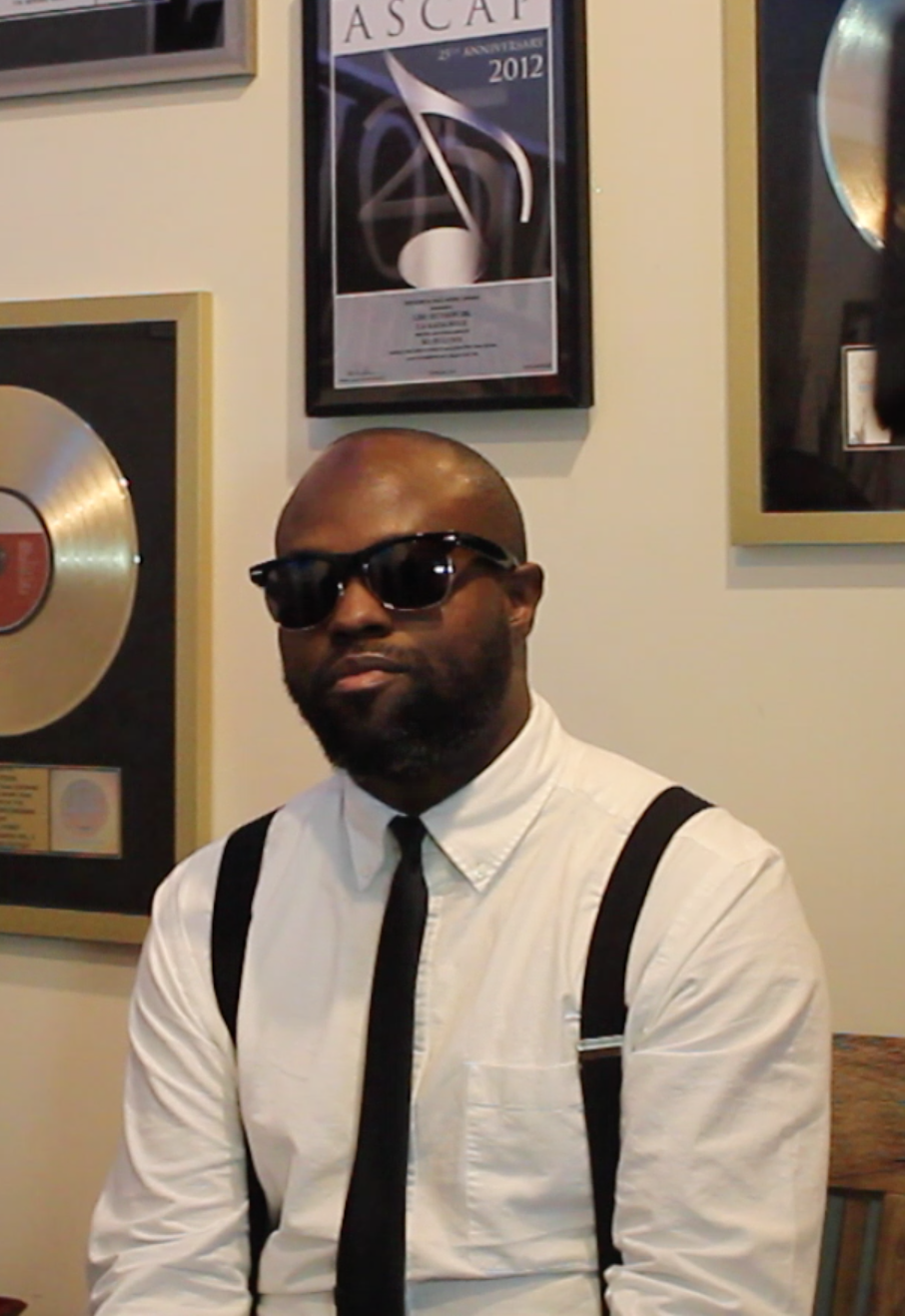

Background information
- Also known as: J.R. Swinga
- Born: Lee Hutson Jr
- Origin: Chicago, Illinois, United States
- Genres: R&B; soul; pop
- Occupations: Record producer; executive producer; music industry executive; songwriter; singer; arranger; instrumentalist; speaker
- Instruments: Vocals; piano; bass
- Years active: 1990-present
- Labels: Warner Bros. Records; Motown; Hidden Beach; Atlantic
- Website: http://www.myspace.com/jrhutson

JR Hutson (born Lee Hutson Jr.) is an American record producer, executive producer, songwriter and talent developer. He has collaborated with several notable artists including Jill Scott, Musiq Soulchild, Stevie Wonder, George Duke, Trick Daddy, Anthony Hamilton, Robert Glasper, Lalah Hathaway, Earth Wind & Fire, Wayman Tisdale and Childish Gambino. Hutson has been awarded Gold and Platinum records. He has also been nominated for four Grammy Awards. He is currently producing and developing talent.

== Early life ==
Hutson was born in Chicago, Illinois, United States. His father is soul musician Leroy Hutson, who was a member of the Curtis Mayfield group The Impressions. His mother was a professional opera singer. Hutson's first musical training came when he attended The American Boychoir School in Princeton NJ. While attending the school, Hutson traveled the country singing. The choir recorded multiple albums as well as the historic rendition of Cindy Lauper's “True Colors” for the Kodak Olympic Commercial.

== Career ==
Singing career and music production Motown Records 1990s
He moved to Miami, Florida, as a teen and added bass, keyboards, songwriting, to his growing list of talents. In high school, he formed a vocal group called Living Proof. Hutson created and produced the music for the group. Living Proof was scouted by many major labels before signing with RCA Records. Hutson left the group, and a year later began a brief but impactful apprenticeship with Teddy Riley in Virginia Beach, Virginia. Soon after his tenure at Teddy's Future Records, Hutson signed as a solo artist to Motown Records under the name JR Swinga. Hutson's most notable accomplishment as JR Swinga was the track "Chocolate City", a nostalgic song about life at a black college. The video for "Chocolate City" was filmed on the Florida A&M University college campus by then budding directors Robert Hardy and Will Packer. While at Motown Records he continued to produce label-mates Boyz II Men, Jason Weaver, Whitehead Bros., 702 & Jazz artist Wayman Tisdale’s very first single called “Circumstance”.

Hip hop production and labels 1990s
Hutson also had a string of notable productions coming out of his native miami. Connecting with Slip N Slide Records, he produced among others a track Featuring Trick Daddy and J-Shin called “You, Me & She”, as well as a host of other local miami rap talent. Hutson also scored his first deal for a hip hop artist he developed named Sianhide. Warner Brothers then executive KRS-One tapped Hutson for his artist and he subsequently dropped the single “We Gon Ride” on KRS's “Temple Of HipHop Kulture” compilation.

Los Angeles and Hidden Beach tenure 2000s to 2007
In the early 2002, Hutson moved to Los Angeles, California, after spending a few weeks producing and developing Vannessa Marquez. While in LA, Hutson reconnected with long time Champion Steve Mckeever who now had an imprint on Sony named Hidden Beach Recordings. Re-kindling his artist passion, Hutson wrote, produced & performed “I Choose You” on the hidden hits compilation. Also, Hutson penned & produced “Wonderful & Special” for HB artist Mike Phillips in which he was the featured singer. After producing many projects for Hidden Beach, it was A&R Charles Whitfield who made a recommendation to HB marquee artist Jill Scott that she collaborate with Hutson on her next album. Legend has it that the Hutson composed instrumental CD that Whitfield gave to Scott is what ultimately became the core of her album, The Real Thing: Words and Sounds Vol. 3. The two formed a very fruitful creative relationship. In an interview with HitQuarters, producer JR Hutson commented on the creation of the song "Whenever You're Around":
"I tried to take a real Quincy Jones approach to that record. I brought in a lot of musicians and we were just vibing to a few different things, and that was one of the tracks that stood out to me in the jam session that day. So I tweaked and tweaked the track, edited it and reformatted it, and then eventually ended up with that track."

2008 The Light Of The Sun to present
In 2008, Hutson connected with Musiq Soulchild to produce the successful ballad "SoBeautiful".

In 2010, Hutson and Jill Scott officially began production on Scott's album The Light of the Sun. Hutson acted as executive producer and co-wrote multiple songs on the album. Recording took place in several locations including 9th Street Studios, Studio 609, Fever Recording Studios in North Hollywood, California, Threshold Sound & Vision in Santa Monica, California, The Studio in Philadelphia, Pennsylvania, The Boom Boom Room in Burbank, California, and The Village Studios in West Los Angeles, California. It features collaborations from Anthony Hamilton, Eve, Doug E Fresh, and Paul Wall. The album was released for pre-order days before it was officially released on June 21, 2011. It debuted at #1 on the US Billboard 200 chart, with 135,000 copies sold in its first week, becoming her first #1 debut on the chart.

In 2012, Dave Pensado featured a "J.R." Hutson produced song called "Missing You" on his "Pensado's Place: Into The Lair Episode #37". Dave explains his mixing techniques for pad synths on the song.

In 2013, Hutson accomplished another line item on his wish list by writing and producing a song for Earth Wind & Fire’s Now, Then & Forever album. This album marked the return of the original EWF line up complete with keyboardist Larry Dunn as well as the original EWF horns. It was the first record the group had recorded after a 10-year recess. Hutson’s track, “Love is Law” is the 2nd track on the album.

== Discography ==
1994
State of Emergency: Society in Crisis, Vol. 1 (Motown Records)

- J.R. Swinga - "Chocolate City"

Rick Simon - Flavors of Love

- "Just Say The Word"
- "Shorties"
- "Flavors Of Love"
- "Play Her Violins"
- "Cause & Cure"
- "Carve Our Name"

Boyz II Men - On Bended Knee (Remix Producer) (Motown Records)

- On Bended Knee (Swingamix)

Whitehead Bros. - Forget I Was A G (Remix Producer) (Motown Records)

- JR Swinga Remix

1995
Wayman Tisdale - Power Forward (Motown Records)

- "Circumstance"

Jason Weaver - Love Ambition (Motown Records)

- For The Love Of You
- Pretty Brown

1996
Wayman Tisdale - In The Zone (Motown Records)

- "These Feelings"

1997
Zhane - Saturday Night (Motown Records)

- "This Song If For You"

1999
The Temple Of Hiphop Kulture - Criminal Justice: From Darkness To Light (Reprise/Warner Bros.)

- "Siahnide - "We Gon' Ride"

J-Shin - My Soul, My Life (Slip-n-Slide Records/Atlantic Records)

- "I'll Do It"
- "Givin' U Luv"
- "U Me & She” Feat. Trick Daddy

2000
Vanessa Marquez - (Unreleased)

- "Want You To Know"
- "Keep On Askin' "

2001
Latrelle - Dirty Girl, Wrong Girl, Bad Girl (Unreleased) (Arista Records)

- "Wrong Girl Interlude"
- "Wrong Girl"
- "Deal With The Pain"

2002
Mike Phillips -You Have Reached Mike Phillips (Hidden Beach/Sony)

- "Wonderful & Special (Feat. “J.R.”)

2003
SWV - Gold And Platinum Collection (BMG Records)

- "Mystery"
- "Can't Cope"

Hidden Hits Vol. 1 - (Hidden Beach/Sony)

- "I Choose You" (Performed By JR Hutson)

2005
Mike Phillips - Uncommon Denominator (Hidden Beach/Sony)

- "Uncommon Denominator"
- "If It Takes All Night (Feat. Trina Powell)
- "G Money"
- “Mike & Michaella (Interlude)”

2007
Jill Scott - The Real Thing: Words and Sounds Vol. 3 (Hidden Beach/Sony)

- "Come See Me"
- "Crown Royal"
- "Whenever You're Around" (featuring George Duke)
- "Wanna Be Loved”
- "Imagination"

I-15 - '(Zone 4/Interscope)

- "Lost In Love"
- "Whit Nike Ya"
- "Shorties"
- "Drug Of Choice"

2008
Musiq Soulchild - OnMyRadio (Atlantic Records)

- "SoBeautiful"

Jill Scott - Live In Paris (Hidden Beach/Sony)

2009
Eric Roberson - (Dome Records)

- "Dealing" (Featuring Lalah Hathaway)

2011
Jill Scott - The Light of the Sun - (Warner Bros.)
JR Hutson Executive Producer

- "So in Love" (featuring Anthony Hamilton) (co-writer)
- "Shame" (featuring Eve and The A Group)
- "All Cried Out Redux" (featuring Doug E. Fresh)
- "Le Boom Vent Suite”
- "So Gone (What My Mind Says)" (featuring Paul Wall)
- "Hear My Call”
- "Making You Wait"
- "Missing You"
- "When I Wake Up"
- "Rolling Hills"

Keke Wyatt - Unbelievable (Shanachie Records)

- "Saturday Love"

Jordan Knight - Unfinished

- "O Face"

Carl Thomas - Conquer (Blue Note Records)

- "The Night Is Yours"

Lalah Hathaway - Where It All Begins (Concord Music Group)

- "Small Of My Back"
- " Wrong Way Map"

2013
Earth Wind & Fire - Now, Then & Forever (Sony Records)

- "Love Is Law"

2014
Leela James - Fall For You-

- "Stay With Me"

2015
Kenny Lattimore - Anatomy Of A Love Song- (E1 Records.)
JR Hutson Executive Producer

- "Still Good" (featuring Da' T.R.U.T.H. and Shanice)
- "Back 2 Cool" (featuring Kelly Price)
- "Built To Last"
- "Beautiful Nowheres"

Maysa - Back to Love (Shanachie Records)

- "Miracle"
- "Smiling"
- "The Radio Played Our Song"

Malcolm Jamal Warner's Miles Long - Selfless
JR Hutson Executive Producer

- "Brand New Day" Feat. Ledisi & Robert Glasper
- “Training Daze”

== Awards ==
=== Grammy Awards ===
The Grammy Awards are awarded annually by the National Academy of Recording Arts and Sciences of the United States.

Year	Nominee / work	Award	Result
2008	The Real Thing: Words And Sounds Vol. 3 (Jill Scott's album) (as producer)	Best R&B Album	Nominated
2010	SoBeautiful (Musiq Soulchild's album)	Best Male R&B Performance	Nominated
2015	Because The Internet (Childish Gambino's album)	Best Rap Album	Nominated
2016	Covered: Recorded Live At Capitol Studios (Robert Glasper's album)	Best Jazz Instrumental Album	Nominated

=== Ascap Awards ===
American Society of Composers, Authors and Publishers (ASCAP) is a non-profit performance rights organization that also holds a series of annual awards shows.

Year	Nominee / work	Award	Result
2010	SoBeautiful by Musiq Soulchild (co-writer)	Award Winning R&B Song	Won
2012	So In Love (Jill Scott Feat. Anthony Hamilton) (co-writer)	Award Winning R&B Song	Won

== Chart positions ==
=== Notable studio albums ===
Year	Album	Artist	Chart Position		
Year	Album	Artist	R&B	US	RAP
2007	The Real Thing: Words And Sounds Vol. 3	Jill Scott	2	4	-
2008	OnMyRadio	Musiq Soulchild	1	11	-
2011	The Light Of The Sun	Jill Scott	1	1	-
2015	Because The Internet	Childish Gambino	3	7	1

=== Notable singles ===
Year	Song	Artist	Credit	Chart Position		
Year	Song	Artist	Credit	R&B	Hot 100	Urban AC
2008	"SoBeautiful"	Musiq Soulchild	Producer/Writer	8	81	-
2011	"So In Love"	Jill Scott Feat. Anthony Hamilton	Writer	10	97	1
