= Angie Fisher =

American singer

- Born: March 6, 199? Los Angeles County, California, U.S.
- Genres: Rhythm and blues
- Years active: 2004–present
- Labels: Innersoul Records (2004); Hidden Beach Recordings (2014–present)
- Website: angiefishermusic.com

Angie Fisher (born March 6, 19??) is an American rhythm and blues singer from California. She began her career with a touring children's choir, then spent several years as a background singer for numerous headline acts.

Fisher released a solo album in 2004. Her first single, "I.R.S.", was released nearly ten years later. "I.R.S." received heavy airplay on a Los Angeles radio station ahead of its official release in August 2014; it was nominated for the Grammy Award for Best Traditional R&B Performance in 2015 while her accompanying album was still in progress.

== Career ==
=== Beginnings ===
Angie Fisher first showed her singing talent at age four while sitting in a closet, trying on a pair of her mother's shoes; from there, she began singing in church. Fisher started her professional career at age 14 as part of All God's Children, a touring children's choir put together by Lou Adler. Fisher spent three years with the choir, which required that her parents sign release forms. Later, she worked as a session singer for artists including Michael Bublé, Celine Dion, Michael Jackson and Robin Thicke. Her performances have included tours with Kelly Clarkson, Clay Aiken, Chaka Khan and Jennifer Lopez.

=== Solo career ===
Fisher was working for Bank of America when she chose to sing a gospel song during an employee game day. The following day, her boss threatened to fire her if she didn't quit and pursue a music career. She then called some contacts she'd already made in the music business and told them she was ready to pursue music full-time.

Fisher released one album through Innersoul Records in 2004. Clef Notes features seven audio tracks and one "bonus video".

Her first single, "I.R.S.", is about "the struggles of life and the things that people go through on a daily basis"; it was released to iTunes in August 2014. KJLH in Los Angeles had begun playing the song nearly two months earlier, after Fisher's manager sent the recording for the station's Music Sessions event. Fisher said "I.R.S." was the station's top-requested song by the end of June 2015. "I think people are embracing it because I’m speaking from a place of emotion."

Her album Searching for Angie Fisher was set for release in 2016 via Hidden Beach Recordings. Along with "I.R.S.", Hidden Beach has released two digital tracks, "Hide & Seek" and "Summertime". A fourth song, "The Roof" featuring B.Slade, was released through SoundCloud.

==== Grammy nomination ====
"I.R.S." was nominated in January 2015 for Best Traditional R&B Performance at the 57th Annual Grammy Awards. Fisher found out via an Instagram message offering congratulations. She verified the nomination by visiting the Grammys website and “busted out in tears. ... It was an overwhelming feeling and they were tears of joy and happiness.” The award ultimately went to "Jesus Children" by Robert Glasper Experiment. Fisher was a featured performer during the afternoon Premiere Ceremony ahead of the awards telecast.

== Personal life ==
Fisher is a native of Pasadena, California. She counts Aretha Franklin, Marvin Gaye and Patti LaBelle among her childhood influences.

== Discography ==
=== Singles ===
- "I.R.S." (2014)
- "tragic" (2018)

=== Albums ===
- Clef Notes (2004)
- Searching for Angie Fisher (TBD 2016)
