= Woman (Jill Scott album) =

Studio album by Jill Scott
- Released: July 24, 2015
- Length: 57:48
- Label: Blues Babe; Atlantic
- Producer: 9th Wonder; David Banner; Adam Blackstone; Warryn Campbell; Ronald Colson; D.K. the Punisher; Andre Harris; Steve McKie; Aaron Pearce; Jameel "JProof" Roberts; Terry "Tru" Sneed; Pop Wansel; Artoro "Toro" Whitfield

Jill Scott chronology
Golden Moments (2015)	Woman (2015)	To Whom This May Concern (2026)

Singles from Woman
- 1. "Fool's Gold" Released: May 4, 2015; 2. "Back Together" Released: July 23, 2015

Woman is the fifth studio album by American singer Jill Scott. It was released on July 24, 2015 via Blues Babe and Atlantic Records.

== Critical reception ==
Professional ratings
Aggregate scores
Source	Rating
Metacritic	75/100
Review scores
Source	Rating
AllMusic	3.5/5 stars
Exclaim!	8/10
The Guardian	3/5 stars
Idolator	4/5 stars
Pitchfork	7.1/10
Spin	8/10

Woman received generally positive reviews from critics. At Metacritic, which assigns a normalized rating out of 100 to reviews from mainstream publications, the album received an average score of 75, based on seven reviews. AllMusic editor Andy Kellman remarked that the album was "so varied that it resembles a compilation itself, albeit one that's scattered in both sound and quality. More than any other Jill Scott album, its impact would likely deepen with some trimming and resequencing. Nonetheless, there's enough high-quality content to sustain Scott's status as one of the most unique and powerful voices in R&B." Colin McGuire from PopMatters felt that on Woman, Scott "wrestles with doubt and anger and what it actually takes to establish a new beginning in one’s life. On her other records, achieving as much seemed as simple as accruing strength. Here, however, she's confronted with the reality of how difficult pressing the reset button can be. There's no posturing. It's just humanity. And with humanity comes complications and clarity, hope and hopelessness, regrets and rebuilding."

Exclaim! editor Ryan B. Patrick noted that "whatever Scott has gone through on an emotional level, Woman finds her at a life stage where she seemingly maintains a balance between optimism and pragmatism, a worldly perspective that informs one of her strongest full-length efforts in a minute." Safy-Hallan Farah from Pitchfork called the album "good but underwhelming". She found that "Scott's fifth studio album is slow in the way that the familiar is slow: we already know what to expect. With Scott, it's mom-and-pop, all-you-can-eat R&B; sexy fun for grown folk over the age of 40, like speed dating at church." Washington Post critic Macy Freeman described the album as "a collection of songs that continues her tradition of celebrating feminine strength." Paul Mardles from The Guardian compared the album with Scott's debut album Who Is Jill Scott?: Words and Sounds Vol. 1 (2000) and wrote: "The understated beauty of her first LP [is] replaced by largely formulaic Philly soul on which she hollers and chastises former beaux. There’s no doubting the quality of her voice but Woman only shines on the moodier songs when Scott lingers over every syllable and puts the vocal acrobatics on hold." He found that "too many tracks are unworthy of a woman who once appeared to represent R&B's future."

== Commercial performance ==
The album debuted at number one on the US Billboard 200 chart, with first-week sales of 62,000 copies, 58,500 of which were physical sales. It marked her second album to reach the top spot.

== Track listing ==
Woman track listing
No.	Title	Writer(s)	Producer(s)	Length
1.	"Wild Cookie"	Jill Scott; Warryn Campbell	Campbell	1:49
2.	"Prepared"	Scott; Andre Harris; Sir Darryl Farris	A. Harris	5:18
3.	"Run Run Run"	Aaron Pearce; Harold Lilly; Elvis Williams; Demario Bridges	Pearce	2:27
4.	"Can't Wait"	Scott; A. Harris; Farris	A. Harris	4:31
5.	"Lighthouse"	Scott; Ronald "Flippa" Colson; Corte Ellis; Pearce; Jameel "JProof" Roberts; Andrew Wansel	Pop Wansel; Roberts; Colson	5:58
6.	"Fool's Gold"	Scott; A. Harris; Farris; Donovan Knight; Joseph Macklin; Carlos Yutaka Del Rosario	A. Harris; D.K. the Punisher	3:24
7.	"Willing Interlude"	Scott; Terry "Tru" Sneed; Pearce; Ellis	Sneed	1:17
8.	"Closure"	Scott; David Banner; Larry Graham; A. Harris; Curtis Mayfield	Banner; A. Harris	3:16
9.	"You Don't Know"	Jerry Ragovoy	Adam Blackstone; Steve McKie	3:49
10.	"Pause Interlude"	Scott; Pearce	Pearce	1:23
11.	"Cruisin"	Scott; Corte Harris; Roberts; Wansel; Artoro "Toro" Whitfield	Wansel; Whitfield; Roberts	3:55
12.	"Say Thank You"	Scott; A. Harris	Harris	4:26
13.	"Back Together"	Scott; Pearce	Pearce	4:08
14.	"Coming to You"	Scott; Pearce	Pearce	3:40
15.	"Jahraymecofasola"	Scott; A. Harris	A. Harris	4:41
16.	"Beautiful Love" (featuring BJ the Chicago Kid)	Scott; Patrick Douthit; C. Harris; Bryan Sledge	9th Wonder	3:40

Target bonus tracks
No.	Title	Writer(s)	Producer(s)	Length
17.	"Ur Gonna Know"	Scott; Pearce	Pearce	3:58
18.	"Fool's Gold" (featuring Pusha T)	Scott; A. Harris; Farris; Knight; Macklin; Terrence "Pusha T" Thornton; Rosario	A. Harris; D.K. the Punisher	3:24

Samples credits

- "Lighthouse" contains a sample of "Ready Set Loop", as performed by SBTRKT.
- "Fool's Gold" contains a sample of "Evening Star", as performed by Yutaka Yokokura.
- "Closure" contains a sample of "Get Down", as performed by Curtis Mayfield and "The Jam", as performed by Graham Central Station.

== Charts ==
=== Weekly charts ===
Weekly chart performance for Woman
Chart (2015)	Peak position
Australian Albums (ARIA)	68
Australian Urban Albums (ARIA)	11
Belgian Albums (Ultratop Flanders)	125
Dutch Albums (Album Top 100)	28
French Albums (SNEP)	119
Swiss Albums (Schweizer Hitparade)	79
UK Albums (OCC)	54
UK R&B Albums (OCC)	9
US Billboard 200	1
US Top R&B/Hip-Hop Albums (Billboard)	1

=== Year-end charts ===
2015 year-end chart performance for Woman
Chart (2015)	Position
US Top R&B/Hip-Hop Albums (Billboard)	26

2016 year-end chart performance for Woman
Chart (2016)	Position
US Top R&B/Hip-Hop Albums (Billboard)	87
