= The Original Jill Scott from the Vault, Vol. 1 =

Compilation album by Jill Scott
- Released: August 30, 2011
- Recorded: June 2000–October 2007
- Studio: various
- Genre: R&B; neo soul
- Length: 66:50
- Label: Hidden Beach
- Producer: Alric and Boyd, Anthony Bell, Adam Blackstone, Carvin & Ivan, DJ Jazzy Jeff, Dre & Vidal, Ronald "Pnut" Frost, Pete Kuzma, George "Spanky" McCurdy, Eric Wortham

Jill Scott chronology
The Light of the Sun (2011)	The Original Jill Scott from the Vault, Vol. 1 (2011)	Golden Moments (2015)

Alternate cover
- Deluxe edition

The Original Jill Scott from the Vault, Vol. 1 is a compilation album by American R&B singer and songwriter Jill Scott, released on August 30, 2011, by Hidden Beach Recordings. It follows the release of her 2011 studio album The Light of the Sun and contains previous unreleased tracks recorded by Scott when she was signed to Hidden Beach. The album was released as a result of the record label's lawsuit against Scott, who left in 2010.

The album charted at number 24 on the Billboard 200 and received positive reviews from critics, who applauded the songwriting and song selection. Scott's cover of "Lovely Day" was released as a single for the album.

== Background ==
In October 2010, Scott left her former record label Hidden Beach Recordings. She was subsequently countersued by Hidden Beach in a complaint that claimed she breached her six-album contract and owed millions of dollars in damages. Hidden Beach founder Steve McKeever said in 2010, "Scott is contractually required to deliver three more albums to Hidden Beach". Their complaint's allegation of damages owed cited the California Labor Code's "De Havilland Law" section, under which certain recording artists who wish to terminate lengthy recording deals are required to reimburse their labels in the amount the labels would have received under the terms of the contracts. The complaint also alleged that McKeever paid Scott's million-dollar advances when he was not required to, allowed her to keep merchandising revenue, paid $ 450,000 to fund a concert DVD that Scott ultimately asked not to be released, bought her lavish gifts, and allowed her a slower recording schedule for her to pursue an acting career.

The lawsuit was settled in 2011, resulting in plans for Hidden Beach releasing an album series of Scott's previously unreleased songs recorded for the label, the first being The Original Jill Scott from the Vault, Vol. 1.

== Recording ==
Following the settlement, Scott worked with Steve McKeever in compiling the music for The Original Jill Scott from the Vault from previous recording sessions. McKeever said of their selections, "These are unheard masterpieces, some of which were meant to be the centerpiece of future albums". They were taken from sessions during June 2000 to October 2007 at several studios in Philadelphia, including A Touch of Jazz (Studio C), Home Cooking Studios, Larry Gold Recording Studio, and Studio 609. Production for those songs were handled by Dre & Vidal, Carvin & Ivan, and DJ Jazzy Jeff, among others. Live songs were taken from Scott's 2000 and 2007 performances at the House of Blues in Los Angeles and the Hidden Beach Launch Party in Santa Monica, California.

The album was mastered using AfterMaster HD Audio. Its liner notes were written by McKeever.

== Release and promotion ==
The Original Jill Scott from the Vault, Vol. 1 was released on August 30, 2011, by Hidden Beach Recording, distributed through Universal Music Group. It was originally scheduled to be released in early June with the title Just Before Dawn: Jill Scott from the Vault, Vol. 1, referencing Scott's subsequent studio release The Light of the Sun and the compilation's songs having been recorded before that album. Steve McKeever said of the change, "In an effort to support her new [album], at Jill’s request we changed the title of our album and moved the release date as not to confuse the marketplace".

The album's pre-order was made available at the label's website, offering a limited edition, deluxe version of the CD, packaged with a DVD featuring all of Scott's past music videos and bonus live performances. The album will be released in both a standard 11-track edition and a deluxe edition, which includes two additional live tracks and a 20-page booklet with song lyrics and producer notes. The album's lead single, a cover of Bill Withers' 1977 song "Lovely Day", was produced by DJ Jazzy Jeff and made available for sale in April via the label's website.

The Original Jill Scott from the Vault, Vol. 1 charted at number 24 on the US Billboard 200 in the week of September 17, 2011. It spent four weeks on the chart. The album also reached number six on the Billboard Top R&B/Hip-Hop Albums, spending eight weeks on the chart.

== Critical reception ==
Professional review scores
Review scores
Source	Rating
About.com	4.5/5 stars
AllMusic	3.5/5 stars
The Independent	3/5 stars

The album was well received by music critics. AllMusic editor Thom Jurek gave it three-and-a-half out of five stars and viewed it as distinctive from most "From the Vaults recordings", stating "Many of the tracks here are finished masters, and virtually everything will delight hardcore Scott fans." Jurek commented that its songs "showcase Scott in excellent voice" and wrote in conclusion, "it enhances the listener's idea of her perfectionist work ethic. It's not only listenable as an 'in process' document, but offers a slew of tracks in various stages that are simply a pleasure to listen to." Andy Gill of The Independent found the album "far better than most contractual fulfilment albums – possibly due to Scott's involvement in its compilation." Mark Edward Nero of About.com noted "the quality and depth of the material" and stated, "it fittingly displays all the talent, charm and creativity that helped propel her to stardom."

== Track listing ==
No.	Title	Writer(s)	Producer(s)	Length
1.	"Intro: Love to Love Prelude"	Jill Scott		0:24
2.	"I Don't Know (Gotta Have You)"	Ivan Barias, Scott	Carvin Haggins, Ivan Barias
3.	"Wondering Why? (You Don't Talk to Me)"	Anthony Bell, Scott	Anthony Bell	3:49
4.	"The Light" (Piano Mix)	Vidal Davis, Andre Harris, Scott	Dre & Vidal	4:10
5.	"Wake Up Baby"	Ronald Frost, Scott	Ronald "Pnut" Frost	3:54
6.	"Lovely Day"	Skip Scarborough, Bill Withers	DJ Jazzy Jeff	4:16
7.	"Dear Mr. & Mrs. Record Industry"	Frost, Scott	Ronald "Pnut" Frost	3:40
8.	"Love to Love"	Scott	Alric and Boyd	3:36
9.	"Running Away"	Adam Blackstone, George McCurdy, Scott, Eric Wortham	Adam Blackstone, George "Spanky" McCurdy, Eric Wortham	5:24
10.	"I'm Prettier"	Pete Kuzma, Scott	Pete Kuzma	4:12
11.	"Comes to the Light (Everything)"	Frost, Scott	Ronald "Pnut" Frost	4:46
12.	"Holding On"	Blackstone, McCurdy, Scott, Wortham	Adam Blackstone, George "Spanky" McCurdy, Eric Wortham	4:53

Deluxe edition bonus tracks
No.	Title	Writer(s)	Producer(s)	Length
13.	"The Light" (Piano Mix)	Davis, Harris, Scott	Dre & Vidal	3:13
14.	"And I Heard... (Do You Understand)" (Live at the House of Blues)	Scott	Jill Scott	9:49
15.	"North Side Philly Love" (Live at the Hidden Beach Launch Party) (Enhanced Video)	Mary Christine Brockert, Scott	Jill Scott

- The deluxe edition features the "original mix" of "The Light" as track 4 and a 12-minute "suite" version of "Running Away" as track 9.

== Personnel ==
Credits for The Original Jill Scott from the Vault, Vol. 1 adapted from AllMusic.

- Alric Anglin – arranger, producer
- Marc Baptiste – photography
- Ivan "Orthodox" Barias – engineer, producer, quotation author
- Anthony Bell – engineer, producer, quotation author
- Barry Benson – marketing
- Christopher Birch – drum programming, keyboards
- Eugenia Shata Bess "Chinah Blac" – background vocals
- Adam Blackstone – bass, producer, quotation author
- Ari Blitz – mastering
- Randy Bowland – acoustic guitar, electric guitar
- Jeff Bradshaw – trombone
- Matt Cappy – trumpet
- Patrick Casserly – executive producer
- Elden Davy – engineer
- Aaron Draper – percussion
- Erik Walls – electric guitar
- Chris Farr – saxophone
- Allen Frost – piano
- Ronald "P-Nutt" Frost – bass, drums, engineer, Fender Rhodes, instrumentation, producer, quotation author
- Thianar Gomis – A&R, administration
- Carvin Haggins – producer
- Mike Harrison – engineer
- Boyd James – arranger, producer
- Jazzy Jeff – producer
- Thornell Jones – marketing
- Pete Kuzma – engineer, producer, quotation author
- Steven Lam – photography
- Keith Major – photography
- Dave Manley – guitar
- George "Spanky" McCurdy – drums, producer
- Steve McKeever – executive producer, liner notes
- Wayna Morris – background vocals
- Tony Nuccio – marketing
- Tyrone Poe – A&R, administration
- Valvin Roane II – background vocals
- John Roberts – drums
- Larry Ryckman – mastering
- Jill Scott – background vocals, producer, vocals
- Wendell "Pops" Sewell – guitar
- Johnnie "Smurf" Smith – keyboards
- Fyah "Stah" Tahs – producer
- Noel Terrell – keyboards
- Jerrold Thompson – A&R, administration
- RaRe Valverde – background vocals
- Gerald Veasley – bass
- Felle Vega Flamenco – guitar, percussion
- Dale Voelker – art direction, design
- Kenneth Whalum III – saxophone
- Lyzel Williams – art direction, design
- Kori Withers – quotation author
- Marcia Withers – quotation author
- Eric Wortham – keyboards, producer
- Dwayne Wright – bass
- Shelly Yakus – mastering

== Charts ==
Chart (2011)	Peak position
US Billboard 200	24
US Billboard Top R&B/Hip-Hop Albums	6
