= Gettin' In the Way =

2000 single by Jill Scott

Single by Jill Scott

from the album Who Is Jill Scott?: Words and Sounds Vol. 1
- Released: October 17, 2000
- Genre: Soul; R&B
- Length: 3:56
- Label: Hidden Beach
- Songwriters: Jill Scott; Vidal Davis
- Producers: Andre Harris; Vidal Davis

Jill Scott singles chronology
"Love Rain" (2000)	"Gettin' In the Way" (2000)	"A Long Walk" (2001)

Music video
- "Gettin In The Way" on YouTube

"Gettin' In the Way" is a song by American R&B/soul singer Jill Scott, released as the second single from her debut studio album Who Is Jill Scott?: Words and Sounds Vol. 1 on the Hidden Beach label. Released on October 17, 2000, the song was her first charting UK single, which peaked at number 30 on the UK Singles Chart, and the top 30 of Billboard's R&B singles chart.

== Track listing ==
UK CD" single

No.	Title	Length
1.	"Gettin' In the Way" (radio edit)	3:56
2.	"Gettin' In the Way" (MJ Cole remix)	6:03
3.	"Gettin' In the Way" (live)	4:16
4.	"Gettin' In the Way" (enhanced video)	3:29

=== Weekly charts ===
Chart (2001)	Peak position
Scottish Singles Sales (Official Charts)	51
UK Singles (Official Charts)	30
UK Dance (Official Charts)	1
UK Hip Hop/R&B (Official Charts)	7
US Hot R&B/Hip-Hop Songs (Billboard)	28
US R&B/Hip-Hop Airplay (Billboard)	23
US Adult R&B Songs (Billboard)	3

| class="col-break col-break-2" |
