= Hate On Me =

Single by Jill Scott

from the album The Real Thing: Words and Sounds Vol. 3
- Released: August 1, 2007
- Length: 3:29
- Label: Hidden Beach
- Songwriters: Jill Scott; Adam Blackstone; Steve McKie
- Producer: Adam Blackstone

Jill Scott singles chronology
"The Fact Is (I Need You)" (2006)	"Hate On Me" (2007)	"My Love" (2007)

Music video
- "Hate On Me" on YouTube

"Hate On Me" is a song by American singer Jill Scott. It was written by Scott along with Adam Blackstone and Steve McKie for her third studio album, The Real Thing: Words and Sounds Vol. 3 (2007), while production was helmed by Blackstone. The song was released as the album's lead single and peaked at number 24 on the US Billboard Hot R&B/Hip-Hop Songs chart. "Hate On Me" also earned her a Grammy nomination in 2008, for Best Female R&B Vocal Performance.

== Glee cast version ==
"Hate On Me"

Single by Glee cast

from the album Glee: The Music, Volume 1
- Released: October 14, 2009
- Recorded: 2009
- Genre: Pop
- Length: 3:30
- Label: Columbia
- Songwriters: Jill Scott; Adam Blackstone; Steve McKie
- Producers: Ryan Murphy, Adam Anders

Glee cast singles chronology
"Keep Holding On" (2009)	"Hate On Me" (2009)	"You Keep Me Hangin' On" (2009)

The song was recorded by the cast of American television series Glee, and was performed in first season episode, Throwdown. It is also featured on the soundtrack album, Glee: The Music, Volume 1.

== Track listing ==
UK CD" Single

No.	Title	Length
1.	"Hate On Me" (Album Version)	3:33
2.	"Hate On Me" (Sole Channel Remix Radio Edit Ft. Mr V)	3:44
3.	"Hate On Me" (Sole Channel Remix Ft. Mr V)	6:20
4.	"Hate On Me" (Reggaeton Remix)	4:09
5.	"Hate On Me" (So Channel Keyapella Ft. Mr V)	6:00

== Charts ==
Weekly chart performance for "Hate On Me"
Chart (2007)	Peak position
US Hot R&B/Hip-Hop Songs (Billboard)	24
US R&B/Hip-Hop Airplay (Billboard)	24
UK Hip Hop/R&B (Official Charts)	16
US Adult R&B Songs (Billboard)	9
