= A Long Walk (song) =

2001 song by Jill Scott

Single by Jill Scott

from the album Who Is Jill Scott?: Words and Sounds Vol. 1
- Released: January 16, 2001
- Recorded: 2000
- Genre: Soul; R&B
- Length: 4:41
- Label: Hidden Beach
- Songwriters: Jill Scott; Andre Harris
- Producers: Andre Harris; Vidal Davis

Jill Scott singles chronology
"Gettin' In the Way" (2000)	"A Long Walk" (2001)	"The Way" (2001)

Music video
- "A Long Walk" on YouTube

"A Long Walk" is a song released in 2001 by American recording artist Jill Scott, from her debut studio album, Who Is Jill Scott?: Words and Sounds Vol. 1. The song peaked at No. 9 on Billboard's R&B Singles chart. It was sampled on the track "Stimulation" from Disclosure's 2013 album Settle.

== Track listing ==
UK CD" single

No.	Title	Length
1.	"A Long Walk" (Album Version)	4:43
2.	"A Long Walk" (DJ Dodge Remix – Soul Part 1 and 2)	9:32
3.	"A Long Walk" (Video)	4:41

== Charts ==
=== Weekly charts ===
Chart (2001)	Peak position
Scottish Singles Sales (Official Charts)	94
UK Singles (Official Charts)	54
UK Dance (Official Charts)	8
UK Hip Hop/R&B (Official Charts)	11
US Billboard Hot 100	43
US Hot R&B/Hip-Hop Songs (Billboard)	9
US Adult R&B Songs (Billboard)	1

=== Year-end charts ===
Chart (2001)	Position
US Hot R&B/Hip-Hop Songs (Billboard)	26
