= The Way (Jill Scott song) =

Single by Jill Scott

from the album Who Is Jill Scott?: Words and Sounds Vol. 1
- Released: June 5, 2001
- Genre: Soul; R&B
- Length: 4:16
- Label: Hidden Beach
- Songwriters: Jill Scott, Andre Harris
- Producers: Andre Harris, Vidal Davis

Jill Scott singles chronology
"A Long Walk" (2001)	"The Way" (2001)	"He Loves Me (Lyzel in E Flat)" (2002)

Music video
- "The Way" on YouTube

"The Way" is the third single released in 2001 by American R&B/soul singer-songwriter Jill Scott, from her debut album, Who Is Jill Scott?: Words and Sounds Vol. 1 on Hidden Beach. The song was her second top 20 hit on Billboard's Hot R&B/Hip-Hop Singles & Tracks chart and peaked at number 60 on the Hot 100 chart.

== Charts ==
=== Weekly charts ===
Chart (2001)	Peak position
US Billboard Hot 100	60
US Hot R&B/Hip-Hop Songs (Billboard)	15
US R&B/Hip-Hop Airplay (Billboard)	13
US Adult R&B Songs (Billboard)	2

=== Year-end charts ===
Chart (2001)	Position
US Hot R&B/Hip-Hop Songs (Billboard)	45
