= Whatever (Jill Scott song) =

Single by Jill Scott

from the album Beautifully Human: Words and Sounds Vol. 2
- Released: January 4, 2005
- Genre: Soul; R&B
- Length: 4:26
- Label: Hidden Beach
- Songwriters: Jill Scott, Ronald "P Nutt" Frost
- Producer: Ronald "P Nutt" Frost

Jill Scott singles chronology
"Golden" (2004)	"Whatever" (2005)	"Cross My Mind" (2005)

"Whatever" is a song released in 2005 by American R&B/soul singer-songwriter Jill Scott, from her album Beautifully Human: Words and Sounds Vol. 2. Scott scored her biggest dance charting song on Billboard's Dance Chart.

== Track listing ==
US CD" Promo

No.	Title	Length
1.	"Whatever" (The co-stars remix feat. Jamal)	4:17
2.	"Whatever" (Notes remix feat. Fresh)	5:02
3.	"Whatever" (Duke & Dantanna remix feat. Tedese)	3:38
4.	"Whatever" (A Cappella)	4:23

== Charts ==
Chart (2005)	Peak position
US Hot R&B/Hip-Hop Songs (Billboard)	34
US R&B/Hip-Hop Airplay (Billboard)	33
US Dance Club Songs (Billboard)	3
US Adult R&B Songs (Billboard)	1
