= Cross My Mind =

Single by Jill Scott

from the album Beautifully Human: Words and Sounds Vol. 2
- Released: May 3, 2005
- Genre: Soul; R&B; spoken word
- Length: 4:45
- Label: Hidden Beach
- Songwriters: Jill Scott, Keith Pelzer; Darren Henson
- Producers: Keith Pelzer & Darren Henson

Jill Scott singles chronology
"Whatever" (2005)	"Cross My Mind" (2005)	"The Fact Is (I Need You)" (2006)

"Cross My Mind" is a single released in 2005 by American R&B/soul singer/songwriter Jill Scott and from her second album, Beautifully Human: Words and Sounds Vol. 2. The song was an R&B top 40 hit, peaking at number 38 on the Billboard Hot R&B/Hip-Hop Songs chart. The song earned Scott her first Grammy Award in 2005, for Best Urban/Alternative Performance.

== Composition ==
"Cross My Mind" includes a jazz piano and loop, with Scott alternating between singing and speaking the lyrics. BBC music critic Daryl Easlea considered the song to reflect her background in poetry. Easlea described the song as a "poem set to minimal piano and beatbox" and considered its chorus "infectious". R&B website Okayplayer included the track in its list of eight Scott songs that "celebrated sexuality through song", highlighting the lyrics "How amazing, how amazing/When you would spread my limbs cross continents", "Bump our bed way over mountains", and "Kiss this and this and this and this".

== Reception ==
=== Critical ===
Rashod Ollison, writing for The Baltimore Sun, deemed the song a "prime cut" from Beautifully Human.

=== Commercial ===
The song became a top 40 hit on the Hot R&B/Hip-Hop Songs chart, peaking at number 38 on the chart dated October 22, 2005, and maintaining that position the following week. It also became her seventh top 10 hit on the Adult R&B Songs chart, reaching number 6 on the chart dated September 24, 2005.

The September 24, 2005, issue of Billboard reported that the song was the most-played track on two stations: WHUR (Washington, DC) and WSRB (Chicago).

== Accolades ==
At the 47th Annual Grammy Awards, held in 2005, "Cross My Mind" was nominated for Best Urban/Alternative Performance. It was one of three Grammy nominations for Scott that year, along with Best Female R&B Vocal Performance (for "Whatever") and Best R&B Album (for Beautifully Human: Words and Sounds Vol. 2). Scott ultimately won the award for Best Urban/Alternative Performance, becoming her first Grammy win. She would go on to win two more Grammy awards in 2007 and 2008.

== Track listing ==
US CD" Promo Single

No.	Title	Length
1.	"Cross My Mind" (Album Version)	4:44
2.	"Cross My Mind" (A Capella)	4:32
3.	"Cross My Mind" (Video)	4:44

== Charts ==
Chart (2005)	Peak position
US Adult R&B Songs (Billboard)	6
US Hot R&B/Hip-Hop Songs (Billboard)	38
