= The Fact Is (I Need You) =

Single by Jill Scott

from the album Beautifully Human: Words and Sounds Vol. 2
- Released: February 7, 2006
- Recorded: 2003
- Genre: Soul; R&B
- Length: 4:38
- Label: Hidden Beach
- Songwriter(s): Jill Scott, Pete Kuzma
- Producer(s): Pete Kuzma

Jill Scott singles chronology
"Cross My Mind" (2005)	"The Fact Is (I Need You)" (2006)	""Daydreamin'" (Lupe Fiasco feat. Jill Scott)" (2006)

"The Fact Is (I Need You)" is a song by American R&B/soul singer/actress Jill Scott. It was released as a radio single in support of Scott's second studio album, Beautifully Human: Words and Sounds Vol. 2. It was the fourth and final single from the album. The track is also featured on her live album, Live in Paris+.

== Charts ==
Chart (2006)	Peak position
US Billboard Hot R&B/Hip-Hop Songs	63
