= Golden (Jill Scott song) =

- UK Single Cover

Single by Jill Scott

from the album Beautifully Human: Words and Sounds Vol. 2
- Released: June 15, 2004
- Label: Hidden Beach
- Songwriters: Jill Scott; Anthony Bell
- Producer: Anthony Bell

Jill Scott singles chronology
"He Loves Me (Lyzel in E Flat)" (2002)	"Golden" (2004)	"Whatever" (2005)

Music video
- "Golden" on YouTube

"Golden" is the lead single released by the American soul and R&B singer-songwriter Jill Scott from her second album Beautifully Human: Words and Sounds Vol. 2. The song peaked at 59 on the UK Singles Chart.

== Track listing ==
US 12-inch promo

No.	Title	Length
1.	"Golden" (Original West Coast Mix)	3:53
2.	"Golden" (Instrumental)	3:53
3.	"Golden" (East Coast 107 Mix)	3:34
4.	"Golden" (A Cappella)	3:51

UK Maxi-Single

No.	Title	Length
1.	"Golden" (Original West Coast Mix)	3:52
2.	"Golden" (Wookie's Sunshine Vocal Mix)	6:07
3.	"Golden" (Jazmin Mix)	7:40
4.	"Golden" (Blackbeard Remix)	6:14

== Charts ==
=== Weekly charts ===
Chart (2004)	Peak position
Scottish Singles Sales (Official Charts)	90
UK Singles (Official Charts)	59
UK Hip Hop/R&B (Official Charts)	10
US Hot R&B/Hip-Hop Songs (Billboard)	31
US Bubbling Under Hot 100 (Billboard)	10
US R&B/Hip-Hop Airplay (Billboard)	29
US Adult R&B Songs (Billboard)	6

=== Year-end charts ===
Chart (2004)	Position
UK Urban (Music Week)	24
