= Beautifully Human: Words and Sounds Vol. 2 =

Studio album by Jill Scott
- Released: August 31, 2004
- Recorded: 2002–2004
- Studio: Various: Axis (Philadelphia) (Note: Tracks 1, 8 and 10); The Underground (Note: Tracks 2, 4, 10, 12 and "Still Here"); Blakeslee Recording Co. (North Hollywood, California) (Note: Track 5); The Studio (Philadelphia) (Note: Tracks 8, 13, 15 and "I Keep"; strings on tracks 5 and 12); Sigma Sound (Philadelphia) (Note: Track 6); Home Cookin' (Philadelphia) (Note: Tracks 7, 9 and 17); Ultrasonic (New Orleans) (Note: Track 8); A Touch of Jazz (Philadelphia) (Note: Track 11); 609 (Philadelphia) (Note: Tracks 14 and 15)
- Genre: Neo soul
- Label: Hidden Beach
- Producer: Ivan "Orthodox" Barias; Anthony "Ant" Bell; Vidal Davis; Ronald "PNutt" Frost; Carvin "Ransum" Haggins; Andre Harris; Darren "Limitless" Henson; Pete Kuzma; Keith "Keshon" Pelzer; James Poyser; Raphael Saadiq; Omari Shabazz; Jimmy White; Kelvin Wooten

Jill Scott chronology
Experience: Jill Scott 826+ (2001)	Beautifully Human: Words and Sounds Vol. 2 (2004)	Collaborations (2007)

Singles from Beautifully Human: Words and Sounds Vol. 2
- 1. "Golden" Released: June 15, 2004; 2. "Whatever" Released: January 4, 2005; 3. "Cross My Mind" Released: March 29, 2005; 4. "The Fact Is (I Need You)" Released: February 7, 2006

Professional ratings
Aggregate scores
Source	Rating
Metacritic	86/100
Review scores
Source	Rating
AllMusic	4/5 stars
Entertainment Weekly	A−
The Guardian	4/5 stars
Los Angeles Times	3.5/4 stars
NME	8/10
Q	4/5 stars
Uncut	4/5 stars
USA Today	4/4 stars
Vibe	4/5
The Village Voice	A−

Beautifully Human: Words and Sounds Vol. 2 is the second studio album by American singer Jill Scott, released on August 31, 2004, by Hidden Beach Recordings. It debuted at number three on the Billboard 200 and number one on the Billboard Top R&B/Hip-Hop Albums with first-week sales of 193,000 copies, earning Scott her first number-one album. The song "Cross My Mind" brought Scott her first Grammy Award, in the Best Urban/Alternative Performance category in 2005.

"Golden" appears in the films Beauty Shop (2005) and Obsessed (2009), as well as on Grand Theft Auto IV's fictional soul/R&B radio station The Vibe 98.8. Comedian Ellen DeGeneres used the song in the closing credits of her 2024 Netflix special Ellen DeGeneres: For Your Approval.

== Track listing ==
No.	Title	Writer(s)	Producer(s)	Length
1.	"Warm Up"	Jill Scott; James Poyser	Poyser	1:20
2.	"I'm Not Afraid"	Scott; Omari Shabazz	Shabazz	3:26
3.	"Golden"	Scott; Anthony Bell	Anthony "Ant" Bell	3:52
4.	"The Fact Is (I Need You)"	Scott; Pete Kuzma	Kuzma	4:38
5.	"Spring Summer Feeling"	Scott; Raphael Saadiq; Kelvin Wooten	Saadiq; Wooten	4:49
6.	"Cross My Mind"	Scott; Keith Pelzer; Darren Henson	Keith "Keshon" Pelzer; Darren "Limitless" Henson	4:44
7.	"Bedda at Home"	Scott; Ivan Barias; Carvin Haggins; Frank Romano; Johnnie Smith	Ivan "Orthodox" Barias; Carvin "Ransum" Haggins	4:22
8.	"Talk to Me"	Scott; Poyser	Poyser	4:44
9.	"Family Reunion"	Scott; Barias; Haggins; George Kerr	Barias; Haggins	5:13
10.	"Can't Explain (42nd Street Happenstance)"	Scott; Poyser	Poyser	4:39
11.	"Whatever"	Scott; Ronald "PNutt" Frost	Frost	4:26
12.	"Not Like Crazy"	Scott; Kuzma	Kuzma	3:58
13.	"Nothing" (Interlude)	Scott; Andre Harris; Vidal Davis	Harris; Davis	1:29
14.	"Rasool"	Scott; Harris; Davis; Tom Brock; Percy Taylor; Barry White	Harris; Davis	3:05
15.	"My Petition"	Scott; Harris; Davis	Harris; Davis	4:12
16.	"I Keep" / "Still Here"	Scott; Harris; Davis / Scott; Kuzma; Dave Manley	Harris; Davis / Kuzma	8:15

European and Japanese edition bonus track
No.	Title	Writer(s)	Producer(s)	Length
17.	"Bedda at Home" (acoustic version)	Scott; Barias; Haggins; Romano; Smith	Barias; Haggins	4:22

=== Sample credits ===
- "Family Reunion" contains elements of "Look Over Your Shoulder" by the Escorts.
- "Rasool" contains a sample of "Mellow Mood Pt. 1" by Barry White.

== Personnel ==
Credits adapted from Tidal.

=== Musicians ===
- Jill Scott - foot stomps (1), body percussion (1), vocal percussion, lead vocals, background vocals (7, 9, 15)
- James Poyser - vocal percussion (1), programming (8, 10), piano (8), keyboards (10)
- Omari Shabazz - all instruments (2)
- Anthony "Ant" Bell - instrumentation (3)
- Pete Kuzma - various instruments (4, 12, 16), piano (3),
- Raphael Saadiq - guitar (5)
- Kelvin Wooten - keyboards (5), bass (5), drum programming (5)
- Keith "Keshon" Pelzer - all instruments (6)
- Darren "Limitless" Henson - all instruments (6)
- Ivan "Orthodox" Barias - various instruments (7, 9)
- Carvin "Ransum" Haggins - voices
- Robert "PNutt" Frost - various instruments (11)
- Andre Harris - various instruments (13, 16), electric guitar (14), bass (15), guitar (15)
- Vidal Davis - various instruments (13, 16), bass (14), drums (15), bells (15),
- Harold Robinson - bass (3)
- Darrell Robinson - drums (3)
- Jimmy White - guitar (4)
- Larry Gold - string arrangements (12)
- Johnnie "Smurf" Smith - keyboards (7, 9)
- Frank "Vegas" Romano - guitar (7)
- Adam Blackstone - acoustic bass (8)
- George "Spanky" McCurdy - drums (8), congas (8)
- Kevin Hanson - guitar (8)
- Nicholas Payton - horn arrangements (8), trumpet (8)
- James Weber - trumpet (8)
- Leon Brown - trumpet (8)
- Clyde Kerr - trumpet (8)
- Rick Trolsen - trombone (8)
- Stephen Walker - trombone (8)
- Steve Suter - trombone (8)
- Darryl Reeves - saxophone (8)
- Brice Winston - saxophone (8), flute (8)
- Rex Gregory - saxophone (8), flute (8)
- Samir Zarif - saxophone (8)
- Allen L. Irvin - voices (9)
- Heavynn - voices (9)
- Andre Dandridge - voices (9)
- Ruscola - voices (9)
- Pino Palladino - bass (10, 16)
- Jeff Bradshaw - trombone (10)
- Matt Cappy - trumpet (10)
- Chris Farr - saxophone (10)
- Chris B - guitar (11)
- Omar Edwards - Rhodes (15)
- Jason Boyd a.k.a. Poo Bear - vocal arrangements (15), background vocals (15)
- Dave Manley - guitar (16)

=== Technical ===
- Kenny Gravillis - art direction, design
- John Hanes - additional engineer [Protools]
- Tim Roberts - assistant engineer
- Gordon Goss - assistant engineer
- James Tanksley - assistant engineer (5)
- John McGlinche - assistant engineer (16)
- Steve McKeever - executive producer, record executive, liner notes
- Jazzy Jeff Townes - executive producer
- Lyzel Williams - executive producer, production consultant, art direction
- Angela Pittman - manager
- Bill Brown - manager
- Șerban Ghenea - mixing (1-12)
- Herb "Pump" Powers - mastering engineer
- Keith Major - photography
- James Poyser - producer (1, 8, 10)
- Omari Shabazz - producer (2), recording engineer (2)
- Anthony "Ant" Bell - producer (3)
- Pete Kuzma - producer (4, 12, 16), recording engineer (4, 12, 16)
- Kelvin Wooten - producer (5)
- Raphael Saadiq - producer (5)
- Darren "Limitless" Henson - producer (6), recording engineer (6)
- Keith "Keshon" Pelzer - producer (6), recording engineer (6)
- Carvin "Ransum" Haggins - producer (7, 9)
- Ivan "Orthodox" Barias - producer (7, 9)
- Robert "PNutt" Frost - producer (11)
- Vidal Davis - producer (13-16), mixing (13-16)
- Andre Harris - producer (13-16), mixing (13-16)
- Anette Sharvit - production consultant (5)
- Ryan Moys - recording engineer (1, 8, 10)
- John Tanksley - recording engineer (5)
- Gerry "The Gov" Brown - recording engineer (5)
- Jimmy White - recording engineer (5)
- Jeff Chestek - recording engineer (5, 12)
- Frank "X" Sutton - recording engineer (7, 9), tracking engineer (7, 9)
- David Farrell - recording engineer (8)
- Tim Day - recording engineer (8, 10)
- John Smeltz - recording engineer (8, 15)
- Vincent Dilorenzo - recording engineer (13-16), mixing (13-16)
- Charles Whitfield - record executive
- Leterance Thatch - record executive
- Kiehl Owens - record executive

== Charts ==
=== Weekly charts ===
Weekly chart performance for Beautifully Human: Words and Sounds Vol. 2
Chart (2004)	Peak position
Belgian Albums (Ultratop Flanders)	41
Belgian Albums (Ultratop Wallonia)	55
Canadian Albums (Nielsen SoundScan)	36
Canadian R&B Albums (Nielsen SoundScan)	17
Dutch Albums (Album Top 100)	31
French Albums (SNEP)	56
Scottish Albums (OCC)	49
Swedish Albums (Sverigetopplistan)	24
UK Albums (OCC)	27
UK R&B Albums (OCC)	5
US Billboard 200	3
US Top R&B/Hip-Hop Albums (Billboard)	1

=== Year-end charts ===
2004 year-end chart performance for Beautifully Human: Words and Sounds Vol. 2
Chart (2004)	Position
US Billboard 200	141
US Top R&B/Hip-Hop Albums (Billboard)	36

2005 year-end chart performance for Beautifully Human: Words and Sounds Vol. 2
Chart (2005)	Position
US Top R&B/Hip-Hop Albums (Billboard)	69

== Certifications ==
Certifications for Beautifully Human: Words and Sounds Vol. 2
Region	Certification	Certified units/sales
United Kingdom (BPI)	Silver	60,000^{‡}
United States (RIAA)	Gold	880,000
^{‡} Sales+streaming figures based on certification alone.
