= Hidden Beach Recordings =

American R&B and Soul independent record label

- Founded: 1998
- Founder: Steven McKeever
- Status: Active
- Distributors: Epic Records (2000–2006); Universal Music Distribution (2007–present)
- Genre: Soul; R&B; contemporary jazz; inspirational
- Country of origin: United States
- Location: Beverly Hills, California
- Official website: hiddenbeach.com

Hidden Beach Recordings is an American independent record label founded in 1998 by Steven McKeever. The label releases music in R&B, soul, contemporary jazz, and inspirational genres and is distributed through Universal Music Group.

== History ==
=== Founder background ===
Born in Chicago, McKeever attended the University of Illinois Urbana-Champaign before earning his Juris Doctor degreee from Harvard Law School in Cambridge, Massachusetts. He began his career as an entertainment attorney at Irell & Manella LLP in Los Angeles. After leaving the firm, he joined PolyGram, where he discovered comedian Robin Harris and produced Harris’ first and only album, Be-Be’s Kids.

In 1991, McKeever joined Motown Records as senior vice president of A&R (artists and repertoire), expanding the label's line-up with musicians including Queen Latifah. In 1992, he launched the Motown subsidiary MoJazz Records, serving as its founding president and overseeing the label’s early roster with Norman Brown, Wayman Tisdale, and other artists. In 1993, McKeever was involved in the sale of Motown to PolyGram Records. By 1994, he was promoted to executive vice president of talent and creative affairs.

McKeever left Motown in 1995 to pursue independent ventures. In 1998, he founded Hidden Beach Recordings. He invited Charles Whitfield to join the company to oversee production and artist relations, and Whitfield later introduced McKeever to NBA star Michael Jordan, who became an early investor in the label.

=== Initial success ===
In its early years, the label issued recordings by both emerging and established artists. Early commercial visibility came with the signing of Jill Scott, one of the label’s first artists. Her debut album, Who Is Jill Scott? Words and Sounds Vol. 1 (2000), received multiple Grammy Award nominations and achieved multi-platinum certification in the United States, helping establish the company during its initial years. Follow-up releases include Experience: Jill Scott 826+ (2001) and Beautifully Human: Words and Sounds Vol. 2 (2004), which also appeared on Billboard charts.

In 2000, Hidden Beach released Paris Rain, a studio album by Brenda Russell. The album marked Russell’s return to solo recording after a recording hiatus and featured collaborations with artists including Carole King, Dave Koz, and Sheila E.. Additional projects during that period included the acquisition and development of Back to Then (2002), a neo-soul oriented solo album by Darius Rucker. Originally recorded for Atlantic Records following Rucker’s commercial success with Hootie & the Blowfish, the project was later developed by Hidden Beach after being shelved.

The label further expanded its roster with releases by Kindred the Family Soul, whose debut album Surrender to Love (2003) appeared on the Billboard R&B charts.

=== Early imprints ===
Hidden Beach developed several label imprints focused on genre-specific releases. The Still Waters imprint was established for inspirational music, including gospel and spoken-word recordings. Releases issued through the imprint received nominations from organizations including the Grammy, Dove, and Stellar Awards. It later introduced the Celebration Series, which focused on themed seasonal releases. Among its release was My Christmas Prayer (2003) by BeBe Winans. According to industry reports, the album reached No. 1 on several Billboard catalog charts and was distributed through a retail partnership with Starbucks, where it sold more than 97,000 units during its initial release period.

=== Unwrapped music series ===
Beginning in 2001, the label released the Unwrapped series, a collection of instrumental interpretations of contemporary rap and hip-hop recordings performed by contemporary jazz artists. Several volumes were issued during the 2000s, including a box set compiling the first four installments. Unwrapped, Vol. 3 featured interpretations of songs such as "In da Club" and "Lose Yourself" and reached No. 3 on the Billboard Contemporary Jazz chart and No. 4 on the overall Jazz chart. The fourth installment, Unwrapped, Vol. 4 (2006), also reached the Top 3 of the Contemporary Jazz chart. Unwrapped, Vol. 5: The Collipark Café Sessions was released in 2008.

Unwrapped Vol. 6: Give The Drummer Some!, featuring Tony Royster Jr., reached No. 1 on the Billboard Contemporary Jazz chart. It was followed by Unwrapped Vol. 7: Back 2 Basics, continuing the series’ reinterpretation of contemporary urban repertoire through contemporary jazz arrangements. In 2019, Hidden Beach reintroduced the Unwrapped series with the release of Unwrapped Vol. 8: The Chicago Sessions, and announced plans for further volumes. A ninth volume, Unwrapped, Vol. 9: The Songs of Kendrick Lamar Reimagined, was released in 2025.

== Hidden Beach Experiences ==
In 2014, Hidden Beach expanded its operations under the name Hidden Beach Experiences, while continuing to operate Hidden Beach Recordings as its primary label. Artists associated with the label include Naturally 7, Jill Scott, Kindred the Family Soul, Mike Phillips, Angie Fisher, and Al B. Sure!.

The company later launched Guardians of Soul, a division focused on projects developed in collaboration with artist estates. In 2015, Hidden Beach worked with the estate of Luther Vandross on The Power of Love: The Luther Vandross Experience, a tribute production created in cooperation with the estate.

== Other projects ==
In 2008, Hidden Beach released Yes We Can: Voices of a Grassroots Movement, a compilation album supporting the presidential campaign of Barack Obama. The recording, released on September 18, 2008, featured performances by several artists including Kanye West, Stevie Wonder, and Sheryl Crow.

After the 2009 presidential inauguration, the company produced Change Is Now: Renewing America’s Promise, a commemorative CD-DVD set featuring music performances by various artists along with selected speeches from the inauguration period. The label also released Hidden Beach Recordings Presents: Hidden Hits Vol. 1 in 2009, a compilation album featuring recordings by Myron, Trek Life, and Kev Brown.

== Discography ==
Studio Albums
Year	Artist	Album
2000	Jill Scott	Who Is Jill Scott: Words and Sounds, Vol. 1
2000	Brenda Russell	Paris Rain
2002	Darius Rucker	Back to Then
2002	Mike Phillips	You Have Reached Mike Phillips
2003	Kindred the Family Soul	Surrender to Love
2003	Jeff Bradshaw	Bone Deep
2004	Jill Scott	Beautifully Human: Words and Sounds, Vol. 2
2004	BeBe Winans	My Christmas Prayer
2004	Bent Fabric	Jukebox
2004	Naturally 7	Christmas: A Love Story
2005	BeBe Winans	Dream
2005	Lina	The Inner Beauty Movement
2005	Mike Phillips	Uncommon Denominator
2005	Kindred the Family Soul	In This Life Together
2006	John Densmore	Tribaljazz
2006	Ontisha	Church Girl
2006	Sunny Hawkins	More of You
2007	Keite Young	The Rise and Fall of Keite Young
2007	Jill Scott	The Real Thing, Words and Sounds Vol. 3
2008	Tony Rich	Exist
2008	Kindred the Family Soul	The Arrival
2010	Al B. Sure!	Honey I'm Home
2010	Mike Phillips	M.P.3
2010	Naturally 7	VocalPlay
2011	Ramsey Lewis and his Electric Band	Taking Another Look
2012	Jeff Bradshaw	Bone Appetit Vol. 1
2012	Jeff Bradshaw	Bone Appetit Vol. 2
2012	Peter Black	Neverwhere: Peter Black's Book Vol. I
2015	Naturally 7	Hidden in Plain Sight
2015	Jill Scott	Golden Moments
2018	Jill Scott	By Popular Demand

Compilation Albums
Year	Artist	Album
2007	Jill Scott	Jill Scott Collaborations
2007	Cornel West	Never Forget: A Journey of Revelations
2008	Various artists	Barack Obama Yes We Can: Voices Of A Grassroots Movement
2009	Various artists	Hidden Beach Recordings Presents: Hidden Hits Vol. 1
2009	Various artists	Change Is Now: Renewing America's Promise
2011	Jill Scott	The Original Jill Scott from the Vault, Vol. 1
2011	Various artists	Hidden Beach Valentines Vol. 1: Love, Passion & Other Emotions
2012	Jill Scott	Remix Fundamentals, Vol. 1 (Spring Summer Feeling)
2015	Kindred the Family Soul	Family Treasures: Greatest Hits

Unwrapped Series
Year	Album
2001	Hidden Beach Recordings Presents: Unwrapped Vol,1
2002	Hidden Beach Recordings Presents: Unwrapped Vol, 2
2003	Hidden Beach Recordings Presents: Unwrapped Vol. 3
2005	Hidden Beach Recordings Presents: Unwrapped Vol. 4
2008	Hidden Beach Recordings Presents: Unwrapped Vol. 5.0
2009	Hidden Beach Recordings Presents: Unwrapped The Ultimate Box Set
2009	Hidden Beach Presents Unwrapped Vol. 6: Give the Drummer Some! Featuring Tony Royster Jr.
2010	Hidden Beach Recordings Presents: Unwrapped Vol. 7 "Back to Basics"
2019	Hidden Beach Presents: Unwrapped, Vol. 8 (The Chicago Sessions)
2025	Unwrapped Vol. 9: The Songs of Kendrick Lamar Reimagined

Live Studio Albums
Year	Artist	Album
2001	Jill Scott	Experience Jill Scott 826+
2008	Jill Scott	Jill Scott Live in Paris
2011	Jill Scott	Live at House of Blues, Sunset Strip

Singles
Year	Artist	Single
2004	Jill Scott	"Still Here"
2014	Angie Fisher	"I.R.S."
2015	Angie Fisher	"Hide & Seek"
2015	Angie Fisher	"Summertime"
2020	Gene Noble	"Too Many Lost"
2020	Gene Noble	"Matching Tattoos"
2022	Phat Yaki	"Leave"
2023	Phat Yaki	"Jupiter"
2024	Frayne Vibez	"Take it Easy"
2025	Frayne Vibez	"Savior"
2025	Frayne Vibez	"Fall Apart"
