= Barz =

Barz may refer to:

== People ==
- Chris Barz, American musician
- Diane Barz (1943–2014), American judge
- Mike Barz (born 1970), American broadcaster and news anchor
- Monika Barz (born 1953), German feminist and professor

== Places ==
- Barz, Iran, a village in Natanz County, Isfahan Province, Iran
- Barz, Kerman, a village in Rafsanjan County, Kerman Province, Iran
- Barz, Romania, a village in a commune in Caraș-Severin County, Romania
