= List of Billboard number-one R&B/hip-hop albums of 2011 =

This page lists the albums that reached number one on the Top R&B/Hip-Hop Albums and Top Rap Albums charts in 2011. The Rap Albums chart partially serves as a distillation of rap-specific titles from the overall R&B/Hip-Hop Albums chart.

== Chart history ==
Key
†	Indicates best-performing albums of 2011

Issue date	R&B/Hip-Hop Albums	Artist(s)	Rap Albums	Artist(s)	Refs.
January 1	Michael	Michael Jackson	Pink Friday	Nicki Minaj	
January 8	Michael	Michael Jackson	Recovery	Eminem	
January 15	Recovery	Eminem	Recovery	Eminem	
January 22	Pink Friday	Nicki Minaj	Pink Friday	Nicki Minaj	
January 29	Pink Friday	Nicki Minaj	Pink Friday	Nicki Minaj	
February 5	Pink Friday	Nicki Minaj	Pink Friday	Nicki Minaj	
February 12	Pink Friday	Nicki Minaj	Pink Friday	Nicki Minaj	
February 19	Pink Friday	Nicki Minaj	Pink Friday	Nicki Minaj	
February 26	Pink Friday	Nicki Minaj	Pink Friday	Nicki Minaj	
March 5	Recovery	Eminem	Recovery	Eminem	
March 12	Recovery	Eminem	Recovery	Eminem	
March 19	Late Nights & Early Mornings	Marsha Ambrosius	Pink Friday	Nicki Minaj	
March 26	Lasers	Lupe Fiasco	Lasers	Lupe Fiasco	
April 2	Lasers	Lupe Fiasco	Lasers	Lupe Fiasco	
April 9	F.A.M.E.	Chris Brown	Lasers	Lupe Fiasco	
April 16	Rolling Papers	Wiz Khalifa	Rolling Papers	Wiz Khalifa	
April 23	Rolling Papers	Wiz Khalifa	Rolling Papers	Wiz Khalifa	
April 30	Rolling Papers	Wiz Khalifa	Rolling Papers	Wiz Khalifa	
May 7	F.A.M.E.	Chris Brown	Rolling Papers	Wiz Khalifa	
May 14	F.A.M.E.	Chris Brown	Rolling Papers	Wiz Khalifa	
May 21	Hot Sauce Committee Part Two	Beastie Boys	Hot Sauce Committee Part Two	Beastie Boys	
May 28	Goblin	Tyler, the Creator	Turtleneck & Chain	The Lonely Island	
June 4	Hot Sauce Committee Part Two	Beastie Boys	Hot Sauce Committee Part Two	Beastie Boys	
June 11	Self Made Vol. 1	Maybach Music Group	Self Made Vol. 1	Maybach Music Group	
June 18	Self Made Vol. 1	Maybach Music Group	Self Made Vol. 1	Maybach Music Group	
June 25	All 6's and 7's	Tech N9ne	All 6's and 7's	Tech N9ne	
July 2	Hell: The Sequel	Bad Meets Evil	Hell: The Sequel	Bad Meets Evil	
July 9	The Light of the Sun	Jill Scott	Hell: The Sequel	Bad Meets Evil	
July 16	4	Beyoncé	Finally Famous	Big Sean	
July 23	4	Beyoncé	Hell: The Sequel	Bad Meets Evil	
July 30	4	Beyoncé	Hell: The Sequel	Bad Meets Evil	
August 6	4	Beyoncé	We the Best Forever	DJ Khaled	
August 13	Here I Am	Kelly Rowland	Hell: The Sequel	Bad Meets Evil	
August 20	4	Beyoncé	Hell: The Sequel	Bad Meets Evil	
August 27	Watch the Throne	Jay-Z and Kanye West	Watch the Throne	Jay-Z and Kanye West	
September 3	Watch the Throne	Jay-Z and Kanye West	Watch the Throne	Jay-Z and Kanye West	
September 10	The R.E.D. Album	Game	The R.E.D. Album	Game	
September 17	Tha Carter IV †	Lil Wayne	Tha Carter IV †	Lil Wayne	
September 24	Tha Carter IV †	Lil Wayne	Tha Carter IV †	Lil Wayne	
October 1	Tha Carter IV †	Lil Wayne	Tha Carter IV †	Lil Wayne	
October 8	Tha Carter IV †	Lil Wayne	Tha Carter IV †	Lil Wayne	
October 15	Cole World: The Sideline Story	J. Cole	Cole World: The Sideline Story	J. Cole	
October 22	Cole World: The Sideline Story	J. Cole	Cole World: The Sideline Story	J. Cole	
October 29	Tha Carter IV †	Lil Wayne	Tha Carter IV †	Lil Wayne	
November 5	Tha Carter IV †	Lil Wayne	Tha Carter IV †	Lil Wayne	
November 12	Tha Carter IV †	Lil Wayne	Tha Carter IV †	Lil Wayne	
November 19	Ambition	Wale	Ambition	Wale	
November 26	Blue Slide Park	Mac Miller	Blue Slide Park	Mac Miller	
December 3	Take Care	Drake	Take Care	Drake	
December 10	Talk That Talk	Rihanna	Take Care	Drake	
December 17	Take Care	Drake	Take Care	Drake	
December 24	Lioness: Hidden Treasures	Amy Winehouse	Take Care	Drake	
December 31	Take Care	Drake	Take Care	Drake	

== See also ==
- 2011 in music
- 2011 in hip hop music
- List of number-one R&B/hip-hop songs of 2011 (U.S.)
- List of Billboard 200 number-one albums of 2011
