= Herta Leistner =

- Born: 25 May 1942; Altensteig, Württemberg, Germany
- Education: Tübingen
- Occupations: Deaconess of the Evangelical Church; Practitioner of social pedagogy Pioneering feminist and leader of the lesbian liberation movement in the church Teacher
- Spouse: Kathrin (partner)

Herta Leistner is a German is a practitioner of social pedagogy, a teacher and an author. She is a Deaconess of the Evangelical (i.e. Protestant) Church who has come to wider prominence as a pioneer of the lesbian liberation movement inside the church.

In 1996 Leistner was awarded the German Order of Merit ("Verdienstkreuz am Bande"). Her award hit the headlines and the high-profile theologian Wolfhart Pannenberg, an uncompromising critic of homosexual practice, returned his own Order of Merit in protest.

== Life ==
=== Provenance and early years ===
Herta Leistner was born at the height of the Second World War in Altensteig, a small town in the Black Forest south of Karlsruhe and Stuttgart. Her father was close to retirement and probably too old to have been conscripted into the army. He worked as a vet. From him she inherited a love for animals which she has sustained ever since. The more decisive influence came from her mother and maternal grandmother who shared the house, making the family home one in which three generations of women lived together. The family's Protestant faith was an important aspect of family life, but it was practiced without dogmatism. As a teenager she attended a girls' "evangelical circle", while quietly nurturing an ambition to become a sports teacher when she grew up.

=== Childhood bereavement ===
Everything changed when her mother committed suicide. She was now sixteen and there was no longer any question of completing her school career to the point at which she would pass the Abitur exam which would have been necessary to progress to any sort of teacher training college or other university level educational institution. The suicide had come shortly after the death of her grandmother, and now it was down to Herta to look after her bereaved father and brother while at the same time running the house. However, approximately a year later her aunt moved in and took over the household duties. Herta Leistner was now able to move away to Stuttgart where she spent an unpaid "diaconal year" at the "Evangelische Diakonissenanstalt" (loosely, "Evangelical Deaconess Institution") where she undertook a training as a "Gemeindehelferin" (loosely, "parish assistant"). During her Stuttgart year she developed a deep attachment for a deaconess. The sisters made their disapproval clear "although there was absolutely nothing going on". Leistner was unsettled by these reactions. She sensed that she was "different", recalling that even at school she had developed a crush on a (female) teacher; while all her contemporaries were chattering excitedly about the boys. She found no words to describe her feelings, but she knew that they must be sinful.

=== Youth worker ===
After that she undertook an apprenticeship in youth work at Denkendorf, before becoming became district organiser for the Ulm region for girls' youth work with the Protestant churches in the area. Protestants were still outnumbered by Roman Catholics in the region, but ethnic cleansing from Silesia and other parts of central Europe during 1944/45 had reduced the extent of the Roman Catholic preponderance. Protestant youth work remained the principal focus of Leistner's life through the 1960s. Looking back she would later recall that youth work was still strongly divided between boys and girls to an extent that a later generation might find hard to appreciate. Towards the end of the decade, encouraged by a teacher, she resumed her studies for the Abitur, on which she had missed out when her mother's suicide had forced her to leave her schooling incomplete. She undertook the necessary work at evening classes in order to avoid disruption of her daytime responsibilities, passing the exam in 1968/69.

=== Mature student ===
The way was now open for a belated return to university level education. Herta Leistner, by now aged 37, moved to Tübingen. A conventional choice would have been to study for a degree in Theology. Leistner chose social pedagogy instead. "Learning Latin and Greek was not really my thing. I thought my value was more as a practitioner than as a theoretician". (Note: "Latein und Griechisch zu lernen, das war nicht so mein Ding, ich schätze mich mehr als Praktikerin ein und nicht als Theoretikerin.") That would make her a good fit for the Bad Boll Evangelical College where she took a managerial post as director of studies in 1974. Her five years as a student at Tübingen came in the wake of the "events" of May 1968 and coincided with a number of rapid societal changes, often with students taking the lead. The period also marked a new awakening for the women's movement to which, as she later told an interviewer, Leistner owed a great deal. It was also at Tübingen that Leistner had her first love affair with another woman. Even after the romance ended and her lover married someone else, the two women would remain on friendly terms.

=== Bad Boll ===
Herta Leistner remained at the Bad Boll Evangelical College (near Göppingen) for almost twenty years: these were the years when her public impact was at its greatest. When she moved on, in 1993, she was able to leave the college uniquely equipped to work through many women's issues from a church perspective. Initially her areas of particular responsibility included adult education and "group dynamics".

In 1977 she was able to spend six months in Philadelphia to undertake further training. She would later look back on this opportunity as a particular stroke of good fortune. "Where group dynamics were concerned, matters were much further advanced than in Germany", she would later recall. She was particularly impressed by the condition of the women's movement in America, eagerly devouring for herself the much discussed book "Beyond God the Father" by the radical feminist philosopher Mary Daly. "That was my theme, which I brought back to Germany: is a masculine redeemer acceptable for women? I wanted to offer the college something on that, and in Elisabeth Moltmann-Wendel I found a brilliant ally for future battles". (Note: "Das war dann mein Thema, mit dem ich nach Deutschland zurückkehrte: Ist der männliche Erlöser für Frauen akzeptabel? Dazu wollte ich an der Akademie etwas anbieten und fand in Elisabeth Moltmann-Wendel eine geniale Mitstreiterin.")

Leistner had already witnessed the emergence of a new feminist movement during her time in Tübingen. The college employed 54 directors of study: just four or sometimes five of these were women. It was impossible not to be critical, but that was not really enough: "We did not simply want to criticise, we wanted to organise religious services the way that worked for us. We knew about Theology. Feminism was a trigger, and we did not shy away from conflict. Service content was important. You had to take a stand to make the thing clear!" (Note: "Wir wollten nicht nur kritisieren, wir wollten Gottesdienste so gestalten, wie wir sie gerne hätten. Wir haben selber Theologie gemacht. Feministisch war ein Reizwort und wir scheuten den Konflikt nicht. Inhaltlich war es uns wichtig. Man muss auch Fronten schaffen, um etwas deutlich zu machen!") The seed of the "Feminist Theology Workshop" - and then of a succession of "Feminist Theology Workshops" - had been sown. Sometimes there were as many as 200 participants at a single session. She would describe these workshops as the highlight of her professional career: they provided the opportunity to be able to seize hold of a range of feminist-theological themes and run with them. During those early years lesbians and lesbianism remained a taboo topic even as the women discussed the male God, the female God and their places in the human world.

The taboo was broken, at least within the feminist theology network, not with explosive publicity but with singular gentleness. One day Leistner gave a small reading circle a book to read that dealt with being a lesbian. There was no immediate reaction inside or outside the college. Later there may have been a few whispers in the corridor: "That Herta is most likely a lesbian herself". The matter had been ventilated: there was sign of any wider wish to discuss it, but somehow it was now becoming among one among the various unspoken assumptions underpinning the women's discussions. In 1983 it nevertheless became apparent that there were a number of women, of whom Herta Leistner was one, who were not content to leave things to rest there indefinitely. That year Leistner and a few fellow campaigners drafted up a message, "Are there any lesbian women in the church at all? If so, get in touch!" (Note: "Gibt es überhaupt lesbische Frauen in der Kirche? Wenn ja, so meldet euch doch!") The message was distributed privately, but then also printed in feminist publications. The response began as a trickle, but in the end around 300 responded. In 1985 the first congress of lesbian church women was held at the Arnoldshain Evangelical Academy facility. Subsequent congresses all took place at Bad Boll. Even at the first of them, the number of participants was unexpectedly large even though the programme spelled out nothing about lesbians and "advance publicity" was restricted to word of mouth and programmes passed by hand. Many of those attending were worried about losing their jobs. The information distributed ahead of the Arnoldshain congress was framed elliptically, under the heading "Lebensformen" ("Lifestyles") and set out topics for discussion such as "How do single women live alone?", "What problems do divorced women have?" and indeed "How do women live together?"

=== Coming out ===
The subterfuge ended in 1987. That was the year of publication for the book "Hättest du gedacht, dass wir so viele sind? Lesbische Frauen in der Kirche" ("Would you have thought that there were so many of us? Lesbian women in the church"). The book was compiled, edited and produced by Monika Barz, Ute Wild and ... Herta Leistner. The authors of the main texts were identified in a subtitle simply as "[die] sanften Verschwörerinnen" ("[the] gentle conspirators"): most had chosen to remain anonymous. They included deaconesses, women pastors, women theologians, women teachers and other women with important links to the evangelical churches. For the avoidance of any residual doubt, Herta Leister now also took the opportunity to "come out".

Both in positive ways and in negative ones, the book proved a milestone: it profoundly consequential for lesbian women. Taken together, the book and the annual Bad Boll lesbian meetings triggered a response across the German speaking world: the annual meetings became a protected space in which lesbian churchwomen were able, for the first time, to create networks and collaborative quasi-political structures. New groupings emerged such as LUK ("Lesbians and the church"), the MuM ("Mary and Martha network") in Bad Boll, and later the "Labrystheia" and NKL ("Network of Catholic Lesbians") networks. For Leistner personally there were ways in which life became ten times easier. "We no longer had to keep anything under cover, and so many good conversations followed". (Note: "Danach war das Leben zehnmal leichter. Wir mussten nichts mehr unter dem Deckel halten und haben so viele gute Gespräche geführt....") Leistner was also very clear that without the strengthening experiences of the previous few years, and without the intellectual underpinnings of the new feminist theology, that book would never have happened. "Only through that did we find the courage to go ahead. And we wanted to counter the extraordinarily powerful inner pressure to see lesbian women as sinful women". (Note: Nur dadurch hatten wir den Mut dazu. Und wir wollten dem außerordentlichen inneren Druck, als lesbische Frauen Sünderinnen zu sein, etwas entgegensetzen.) The book met with widespread approval and opened doors to a more open approach to dealing with a range of life issues. But there was also a powerful tide of opposition. Some of the most shrill expressions of shock and hostility came from churchmen and churchwomen inside the evangelical churches, and especially from the churches' evangelical wing.

=== Reaction ===
In the regional Württemberg synod of the Protestant Churches there were plenty of delegates who in 1987 were already keen to cut the funding for the Bad Boll Evangelical College

- "Die Evangelikalen, die in Württemberg stark vertreten sind, haben mich und meine Lebensform herausgepickt, um die Akademie in Bad Boll, die ihnen mit ihren fortschrittlichen Themen schon immer ein Dorn im Auge war, anzugreifen. Ich wurde zur Buh-Frau gemacht!."
- "The evangelicals, who are well represented in Württemberg, picked out me and my lifestyle in order to attack the college in Bad Boll, which had always been, for them, a thorn in the side, with all its progressive ideas. I was made into the bogeywoman."

Herta Leistner, quoted in 2018 by Juliane Brumberg

There was discussion within the churches of launching a disciplinary process against Leistner, citing the legalistic grounds that her name and address were included in the book as a potential contact point for lesbian women. Many of the attacks became intensely personal Leistner was subjected to an "inquisition" by clerical interrogators who accused her of turning the Bad Boll College into a "Temple of lesbian love" ("Tempel der lesbischen Liebe"). They alleged that the "lesbian conferences" were simply a device on the part of Herta Leistner whereby she might find more lesbian friends for herself. And they demanded that lesbian and feminist themes be expunged from the Bad Boll curriculum.

The nature of the attacks on Leistner after she "came out" and the demands of her critics seem to have left those in charge at Bad Boll no choice but to defend her position.

- "Meine Chefs haben die Freiheit der Akademie verteidigt und es ist damals zwar ganz knapp, aber gut ausgegangen."
- "My bosses defended the [academic] freedom of the college. At the time it was a close run thing, but it turned out well."

Herta Leistner, quoted in 2018 by Juliane Brumberg

Leistner stood firm, successfully resisting calls for a ban on feminist and lesbian themes at Bad Boll. "Actually", she insists looking back, "I favour compromise and harmony. But I don't let my faith and way of life be denied. In that respect, I'm stubborn like a tank," (Note: "Eigentlich, bin ich eher harmoniegeprägt, aber ich lasse mir meinen Glauben und meine Lebensweise nicht absprechen. Da bin ich stur wie ein Panzer.") That was just as well, because the attacks targeting Bad Boll were no more than a foretaste of what would follow. The "ad hominem" pattern persisted, and not all the attacks were subtle: an article appeared in the Stuttgarter Zeitung (newspaper) under the headline "Die Sünde hält Einzug in die Kirche" ("Sin infiltrates the church"). A large photo-portrait of Herta Leistner was placed next to the text and directly below the headline.

=== Progress. And intensified opposition ===
Leistner's cause was helped by her stubbornness, but also by the wider social currents of the times. She never lost her belief that change from within was a possibility for the church as an institution. After long negotiations the Evangelical Church agreed to create its own "Frauenakademie" ("Women's Academy") study centre as a contribution to the Decade of Women ("Frauen-Dekade") proclaimed by the World Council of Churches. (The decade was to run from 1988 till 1998.)

A location for the new institution was found at Gelnhausen in the hills east of Frankfurt. Only two directors of study were appointed. One of them was Herta Leistner, who had worked so tirelessly to bring the project to this stage. In the middle of all this she completed a dissertation, receiving a doctorate jointly with Monika Barz from the University of Hannover in 1993. The title of their work suggested that it owed much to personal real-life experiences: "Aus der Nichtexistenz auftauchen… Der Beitrag der Tagungsarbeit zum Identitätsbildungsprozess lesbischer Frauen in der Kirche" ("Emergence from non-existence... The contribution of Conference Work to the Identity Development Process") of "Lesbian Women in the Church").

Construction of the Anna Paulsen House began in 1993. This had the effect of unleashing a renewed volley of media criticism, more strident and more personally hostile than ever, from the evangelical conservatives. Critics railed against the "Power of false teaching" ("Kräfte der Irrlehre") and "feminist extremists" who were threatening the very sacrament of marriage because they wanted to promote "lesbian partnerships" that propagated "group sex" and ridiculed the death of Christ as "sadomasochistic": in short, these feminists dragged sinfulness into the church. In the estimation of one commentator, all that was missing from the witch hunt was the call for burnings at the stake. It seems clear that Herta Leistner by now had attained a heightened public profile which made her something of a hate figure for evangelical conservative campaigners. They organised a petition demanding that her appointment as director of studies at the new institution should be rescinded. This attracted 12,000 signatures, but failed to persuade the EKD (church) hierarchy to their point of view. Necessary building works having been completed, the "Frauenstudien- und -bildungszentrums der Evangelischen Kirche" at the Anna Paulsen House was inaugurated in the summer of 1994 with a small celebration at the premises. On the edge of the ceremony were grouped 150 demonstrators carrying banners with messages such as "Frauenzentrum oder Hexenkessel?" ("Women's Centre or witches cauldron?"). One enraged conservative pastor marked the occasion with a sermon:

- "...Brothers and sisters, let us do penance and listen to God's word and obey. ... Let us take God's word seriously, listen and obey. This is what we hear: [two New Testament Bible extracts follow]. We also hear God's call to Moses ... If a man lays with a man as a man lays with a woman, they have both committed abomination. They should be killed..." (Note: "Brüder und Schwestern, lasst uns Buße tun und auf Gottes Wort hören und gehorchen. ... Lasst uns Gottes Wort tod ernst nehmen, auf es hören und gehorchen. So hören wir: ... (es kommen zwei neutestamentliche Bibelzitate). Hören wir auch auf den Ruf Gottes an Mose ... Wenn einer bei einem Manne liegt, wie man bei einer Frau liegt, so haben beide einen Gräuel verübt. Sie sollen getötet werden... ".)

That hurt. Clearly it still hurt in 2009 when Herta Leistner quoted it in her acceptance speech at an award ceremony.

=== Order of merit. More reaction ===
Another orchestrated media storm blew up in 1996 after Leister was awarded the German Order of Merit ("Verdienstkreuz am Bande") for "services to the perception and emancipation of lesbian women in the church and society". (Note: "Verdienste um die Wahrnehmung und Emanzipation lesbischer Frauen in Kirche und Gesellschaft") She was the first German to be honoured with that citation. The critics evidently caught the ear of President Herzog (CDU) whose office distanced itself from the citation, insisting when pressed that the award reflected not just Leistner's engagement in respect of lesbians, but the entire body of her social commitment in her work for young people and for women. That did not prevent one professor of theology from return his own Order of Merit as a protest against Leistner's award.

Leistner faced criticism from some members of the Evangelical Church in Germany, and senior church figures distanced themselves from her, which some commentators linked to her personal life. In 2009, the Open Church of Württemberg awarded Leistner the “AMOS Prize” for civil courage in church and society.

=== Later years ===
For another eight years Herta Leistner continued to work at the Women's Study and Training Centre at Gelnhausen. She retired in 2004 after which the facility was closed and the operation was replaced by a smaller EKD study centre in Hanover. She is characteristically reflective about these developments: "We created and ran the Women's Study Centre at Gelnhausen for more than ten years, and were also able to use it to bring to fruition the 'Distance-learning feminist theology' which has flourished. Everything has its time. You only have to look to see how much progress has been made, but of course there is still much that remains to be done. The old days when we launched the project, even back when we were still at Bad Boll, cannot be brought back. If I were still at that stage today, I would do things quite differently".

Herta Leistner retired in 2004 and settled with Kathrin, her partner of long-standing, in a small village in Thuringia where her Swabian accept attracts a measure of incredulity and they acquired an agricultural property. Katrina is both a pastor and a homeopathic vet, but for Herta Leistner it was important that when she retired she should make a complete break from her church career: there were already, she observed, enough scars from those times. In 2018 a visiting interviewer recorded that the women share their well-kept smallholding with their dogs, two horses and two prize-winning Shetland ponies. The barn contains a hay mower and a large tractor, as well as a cart small enough to be drawn by a single pony.

== Concluding thoughts ==
Leistner tells of the continuing insults and slander that she experienced with the detachment of a chronicler, rather than as a victim of witch hunts. What made her persist? "I'm fairly true to my principals," she reflects, "I try and see through whatever I start". Many churchwomen - not just the lesbians among them - have much reason to be thankful for that. Leistner herself knows that many of them "felt very encouraged" by the lead she was taking. Invited to sum up nearly a quarter of a century of feminist church education, she refers back to the origins of her work: "Feminist theology re-awakened my enthusiasm for the faith, from which I had previously felt alienated. And together we reaffirmed that we were also a part of the church - another part." She takes pride in the fact that in recent years that other part has found official recognition. "Perhaps I was simply in the right place at the right time".
