= Ambition (Wale album) =

Studio album by Wale
- Released: November 1, 2011
- Recorded: 2010 – September 28, 2011
- Genre: Hip-hop
- Length: 60:10
- Labels: Allido; Maybach; Warner Bros.
- Producers: Rick Ross (exec.); Chris Barz; Cloudeater; Deputy; Diplo; DJ Toomp; Jerrin Howard; Kore; Lex Luger; Mark Henry; Tha Bizness; T-Minus; Tone P.

Wale chronology
Attention Deficit (2009)	Ambition (2011)	Folarin (2012)

Singles from Ambition
- 1. "That Way" Released: August 30, 2011; 2. "Chain Music" Released: September 2, 2011; 3. "Bait" Released: September 2, 2011; 4. "Lotus Flower Bomb" Released: October 11, 2011; 5. "Focused" Released: October 18, 2011; 6. "Sabotage" Released: January 31, 2012

Ambition is the second studio album by American rapper Wale. It was released on November 1, 2011, by Allido Records, Maybach Music Group and Warner Bros. Records. This serves as the follow-up to his debut album, Attention Deficit, which was released in 2009. The production on the album was handled by multiple producers including Lex Luger, T-Minus, Tha Bizness, DJ Toomp and Diplo among others. The album also features guest appearances from Rick Ross, Lloyd, Ne-Yo, Big Sean, Miguel, Meek Mill, Kid Cudi, and Jeremih.

Ambition was supported by six official singles: "That Way", "Chain Music", "Bait", Lotus Flower Bomb", "Focused" and "Sabotage". The album was also a commercial and critical success, receiving generally positive reviews from music critics. It debuted at number two on the US Billboard 200 chart, selling 164,000 copies in its first week. In November 2026, the album was certified Platinum by the Recording Industry Association of America (RIAA).

== Background ==
On July 20, 2011 Wale began releasing video blogs titled "#Nodaysoff Vlog: Wale – The Making of 'Ambition'" through the Maybach Music Group Channel. In an August 2011, interview with HipHopDX, Wale spoke about how the album is the best music he's ever made, saying: "I’m putting out 10 new songs when I get up to a million follower on Twitter - [songs not from] the album. And I got a lot of freestyles, some classic shit, not playing no more. It’s been too… I feel like I’m one of the best, you know? And I wanna give my fans a reason to brag now like, "Yo, this is what I like Wale the most." A lot of niggas is nice, I'm just tryin' to take it up a notch like, we is working. I'm working vigorously. I'm mentally getting right. Working out, getting physically right. Reading more, I'm back to the old me. The vigor that I had with 100 Miles & Running is like, all over the album, it's the best music I’ve ever made in my life and I mean that."

In the same interview, he spoke about his mindset on the album, saying:

"End all, be all. You. I want to have this conversation with everybody who asks me that question. You. A lot of people would kill to be where you at, right? But you would kill seven motherfuckers to get to where you wanna go in your mind. It’s a stepping stone. Young niggas really gotta get on they shit, for real. Whether you in the league, you playing basketball, whether you selling dope, whether you in school… We gotta get on our shit! Our parents ain’t have no m'fuckin' e-mail, m'fuckers had to memorize numbers and… The least we can do is grind! How many young Lyor Cohens you see? How many young Diddys you see? None! A lot of young niggas is in it right now as if they only wanna be in it temporarily, I want it forever! Fuck the money, fuck the fame, I want niggas to say, "You know what? Wale make that… Psssh… Man… For real. For years. I love this nigga's music." Young niggas don’t aspire to be legendary no more. They don’t. Niggas our age are so consumed in the now. That’s why they follow trends. That’s why they do little akee shit, weirdo shit…know what I’m saying? Young niggas don’t want shit but "now." The temporary riches, like, I want the forever, I want the forever glory. Temporary riches is nothing to forever glory. That’s what we striving for, that’s what Ambition is."

On August 22, 2011, in an interview with MTV, Wale revealed he and Kid Cudi reconciled and were working on a song for the album, tentatively titled "Focused". This was the first time Wale and Kid Cudi collaborated musically since the release of "Is There Any Love?" in 2008. The two were previously not working together, because of a small falling-out that they had in September 2010. On September 28, 2011, through his Twitter feed, Wale announced he officially completed the album. In an October 2011, interview with Complex, Wale spoke about the album, saying: "The defining moment of my career will be Ambition.. [The album] is complete and I have every intention of making this a classic album. I was telling Drake the other day, a lot of the people that came before us worked a lot harder and things didn’t come as easy to them." In the same interview, he spoke about the song "Ambition", saying: "Ambition" is a record that's on the album that's very important because it's the title track. The most famous rapper on the album is obviously Rick Ross, so I wanted him to bring a lot of attention to "Ambition" because it's what the album is about. I also wanted my fans to hear another side of Rick Ross. He touches on some things that he never really spoke on before on that verse." He also spoke about working with DJ Toomp on the album, saying: "[I worked with the] legendary DJ Toomp on the album. I'm 100% sure Toomp is someone I will be working with a lot in the future. One of the album's most [important] records is ‘Legendary,’ which Toomp produced. All I got to say is, if I only got three minutes and 30 seconds, ‘Legendary’ is what I would want them to listen to."

== Release and promotion ==
On August 17, 2011, Wale released a mixtape titled The Eleven One Eleven Theory, in reference to Ambition's release date. The mixtape features production from DJ Toomp, Sonny Digital, and Tone P, and features songs such as "Bait", "Chain Music" and the single "That Way".

To promote Ambition, Wale went on the Ambition Tour from October 2, 2011, until December 8, 2011. It started in Minneapolis, Minnesota and ended in Atlanta, Georgia. The tour featured Black Cobain from The Board Administration as the opening act.

"Bait" was used as the theme music for professional wrestling promotion Major League Wrestling's television series, MLW Fusion, from 2018 to 2021.

== Singles ==
The album's first promotional single, "Bad Girls Club" featuring J. Cole was released on June 15, 2011. On November 1, 2011, the music video was released for "Bad Girls Club" featuring J. Cole. The album's second single, "Chain Music" was released to digital retailers on September 2, 2011. On December 15, 2011, the music video was released for "Chain Music". The album's third single, "Bait" released to digital retailers on September 2, 2011. On October 20, 2011, the music video was released for "Bait". The album's fourth single, "Lotus Flower Bomb" featuring Miguel was released to digital retailers on October 11, 2011. On November 15, 2011, the music video was released for "Lotus Flower Bomb" featuring Miguel. The album's fifth single, "Focused", features vocals by Kid Cudi and was released to digital retailers on October 19, 2011. "Sabotage" featuring singer Lloyd was released to US urban radio as the album's sixth single on January 31, 2012. On March 20, 2012, the music video was released for "Sabotage" featuring Lloyd. On February 19, 2012, the music video for "Slight Work" featuring Big Sean was released. On March 13, 2012, the music video for "Ambition" featuring Meek Mill and Rick Ross was released.

== Critical reception ==
Professional ratings
Aggregate scores
Source	Rating
Metacritic	(69/100)
Review scores
Source	Rating
AllHipHop	(7/10)
AllMusic	4/5 stars
Consequence of Sound	3.5/5 stars
HipHopDX	4/5 stars
Paste	(5.6/10)
Pitchfork	(6.7/10)
PopMatters	(5/10)
Rolling Stone	3/5 stars
Slant Magazine	3/5 stars
XXL	(XL)

Ambition received generally positive reviews from music critics. At Metacritic, which assigns a normalized rating out of 100 to reviews from mainstream critics, the album received an average score of 69, based on 15 reviews, which indicates "generally favorable review". David Jeffries of AllMusic gave the album four out of five stars, saying "As far as why it all hangs together so well, credit goes to Wale’s talent and his strong personality, which here has grown into an interesting combination of Lil Wayne and Plies, with a little 50 Cent smirk and bit of Drake’s phrasing thrown in for good measure." Adam Kivel of Consequence of Sound gave the album three and a half stars out of five, saying "Wale is a strong lyricist, one that conveys an inner vision far better than most in the game. Combined with a good ear for beats, this makes Ambition a strong sophomore release, one that shouldn’t disappoint old fans while drawing in new ones." Edwin Ortiz of HipHopDX gave the album four out of five stars, saying "With a tight-knit collection of features and palpable confidence exuded in his lyrics, Ambition is Wale’s most cohesive and likewise enthralling project thus far in his brisk career. As such, the magnitude of this album rests in the hook of the title-track. Wale doesn’t expect every fan to symbolize their appreciation with a SoundScan; just don’t hold your applause." Luke Winkie of Paste gave the album a 5.6 out of 10, saying "It’s just not very fun. Wale’s conversion to Ross’ braggy rap-excess didn't seem like a great idea in theory, and stretched out to an hour his updated, devolved craft starts to wear thin very, very quickly. He doesn't have the same fire, conviction, or really any feasible statement of purpose. Competently dull in the worst ways possible and even further removed from the things that made him special in the first place, Wale may have found a permanent home within the Maybach family, but his top-tier dreams (or ambitions if you must) seem to be long gone."

Simon Vozick-Levinson of Rolling Stone gave the album three out of five stars, saying "He's too quick to reach for sexist clichés; cheap shots at groupies and gold diggers undercut moments of real emotion. What Wale lusts for most of all is respect. "Fuck fame, fuck money," he declares. "I'm just trying to be legendary." Someday, maybe, but not quite yet." The A.V. Club gave the album a B, saying "In its efforts to woo women listeners, Ambition softens some of the harder edges from Maybach’s other releases, but Ross’ rotund shadow looms large over the record nonetheless. The mogul gets feature credits on two songs, and even on a couple of tracks he isn't billed on. He's there in the background, grunting approvingly, reminding everybody who made this possible." David Amidon of PopMatters gave the album a five out of ten, saying "There’s also no risks taken here compared to his debut. Instead, Ambition gives us pretty much the same song over and over again with just a few variations on the template, and feels like the hip-hop equivalent of listening to some pop rock band’s album who you’d never have guessed was being bet on by a major unless you were told. The music’s efficient and there’s literally nothing to get annoyed or disgusted by (unless "Illest Bitch" weirds you out for his calling his sister in a bitch in a positive context) and so Ambition leaves listeners to answer the simple question of whether they want an exceptionally unchallenging album to listen to for an hour or not. I'll just take the highlights."

Adam Fleischer of XXL gave the album an XL, saying "The sonic mood of Ambition reflects its title and author and proves, on the whole, far warmer than his debut. On the title track, he raps, "They gon’ love me for my ambition/Easy to dream a dream, though it's harder to live it." Wale seems to be living his on this sophomore album." Jon Garcia of AllHipHop gave the album a seven out of ten, saying "Ambition is a pretty decent album – but it won’t stick out the way his early mixtapes did. Is he "Focused" like Cudi says? Perhaps, but true Wale fans will look for more substance and clashing drums on his projects. At least you'll have the wordplay to hold you over." Jesal Padania of RapReviews gave the album a 6.5 out of 10, saying "To be honest, "You will enjoy it for a while, and in a year, I guarantee that you will not be listening to it, save for a few songs (such as "Legendary" and "Ambition"). The quality of the music reflects this, as does the depth of Wale's subject matter. But Big Macs are still enjoyable in their own way, as is this album." Matthew Cole of Slant Magazine gave the album three out of five stars, saying "Where Jay-Z excels at bragging about his career and Drake makes whining about his fame seem insightful, when Wale starts sweating his legacy, he instantly stops being fun to listen to. For an album so obsessed with the amount of willpower that was poured into it, Ambition doesn't even secure Wale the Most Improved Rapper award, let alone the Most Likely to Succeed."

== Commercial performance ==
Ambition debuted at number two on the US Billboard 200 chart, selling 164,000 copies in its first week. This became Wale's first US top-ten debut on the chart. In its second week, the album dropped to number 15 on the chart, selling an additional 41,000 copies. In its third week, the album dropped to number 18 on the chart, selling 29,000 copies. In its fourth week, the album dropped to number 56 on the chart, selling 21,000 copies. As of June 2013, the album has sold 482,000 copies in the US. On November 2, 2026, the album was certified Platinum by the Recording Industry Association of America (RIAA) for combined sales and album-equivalent units of over 1,000,000 units in the United States.

== Track listing ==
Information is largely taken from the album's liner notes.

On YouTube * Ambition (streamed copy where licensed), the credits are in the description.

No.	Title	Writer(s)	Producer(s)	Length
1.	"Don't Hold Your Applause"	Olubowale Akintimehin; Ernest Price	Tone P.; Chris Barz	3:14
2.	"Double M Genius"	Akintimehin; Mark Henry; Alan Parker; Walker Johnson	Mark Henry; EnDuhStreatZ (co.)	2:48
3.	"Miami Nights"	Akintimehin; Henry; William Roberts; Ricardo Williams	Mark Henry; Dre King (co.)	3:36
4.	"Legendary"	Akintimehin; Aldrin Davis; Bunny Sigler	DJ Toomp; Lil' Lody (add.)	5:04
5.	"Lotus Flower Bomb" (featuring Miguel)	Akintimehin; Jerrin Howard; Miguel Jontel Pimentel; Samuel Joseph Dew; Johnson	Jerrin Howard	3:33
6.	"Chain Music"	Akintimehin; Price	Tone P.	3:20
7.	"Focused" (featuring Kid Cudi)	Akintimehin; Djamel Fezari; Scott Mescudi; Johnson	Kore	3:32
8.	"Sabotage" (featuring Lloyd)	Akintimehin; Anthony Nolan Kramer; Daniel Ford Friedman; Christopher Darrel Hunt; Dew; Lloyd Harlin Polite Jr	Cloudeater	5:28
9.	"White Linen (Coolin')" (featuring Ne-Yo)	Akintimehin; Jamil Pierre; Shaffer Chimere Smith	Deputy	3:37
10.	"Slight Work" (featuring Big Sean)	Akintimehin; Diplo; Sean Anderson	Diplo	3:39
11.	"Ambition" (featuring Meek Mill & Rick Ross)	Akintimehin; Robert Williams; Roberts; Tyler Williams; Price	T-Minus	5:02
12.	"Illest Bitch"	Akintimehin; Christopher Whitacre; Justin Henderson	Tha Bizness; Terrace Martin (add.)	4:16
13.	"No Days Off"	Akintimehin; Davis	DJ Toomp	3:35
14.	"DC or Nothing"	Akintimehin; Price; Whitacre; Henderson	Tone P.	4:58
15.	"That Way" (featuring Jeremih & Rick Ross)	Akintimehin; Roberts; Jeremih Felton; Lexus Luger	Lex Luger	4:29
Total length:				60:10

Deluxe edition bonus track
No.	Title	Writer(s)	Producer(s)	Length
16.	"Bait"	Akintimehin; Price	Tone P.	4:29
17.	"Bad Girls Club" (featuring J. Cole)	Akintimehin; Jermaine Cole	J. Cole	4:33

2023 vinyl release
No.	Title	Writer(s)	Producer(s)	Length
16.	"Bait"	Akintimehin; Price	Tone P.	4:29
17.	"Passive-Aggress Her"	Akintimehin; Sonny Uwaezuoke; W. Johnson	Sonny Digital	3:38

Sample credits

- "Legendary" contains excerpts from "You Got Your Hooks in Me" written by Bunny Sigler and performed by Barbara Blake & The Uniques.
- "Chain Music" contains excerpts from "Hard In The Paint Freestyle" performed by Rick Ross Waka Flocka Flame.
- "Sabotage" contains excerpts, interpolations and samples of "Sabotage" written and performed by Cloud Eater.
- "That Way" contains excerpts and samples of "Give Me Your Love", written and as performed by Curtis Mayfield and interpolations and samples of "I'm the Only Woman", written by LaTonya Blige-DaCosta, Curtis Mayfield, Sean Combs, Chucky Thompson, Andre Harrell and Faith Evans, as performed by Mary J. Blige.

Notes

- "Double M Genius", "Lotus Flower Bomb" and "Focused" contains background vocals by Tre.
- "Chain Music" features additional vocals from Rick Ross.
- "Slight Work" contains background vocals by Cherie Lily.
- "Bait" features additional vocals from TCB.

== Charts ==
=== Weekly charts ===
Chart (2011)	Peak position
Canadian Albums Chart	77
US Billboard 200	2
US Top R&B/Hip-Hop Albums (Billboard)	1
US Top Rap Albums (Billboard)	1

=== Year-end charts ===
Chart (2011)	Position
US Billboard 200	155
US Top R&B/Hip-Hop Albums (Billboard)	41
US Top Rap Albums (Billboard)	21
Chart (2012)	Position
US Billboard 200	129
US Top R&B/Hip-Hop Albums (Billboard)	22
US Top Rap Albums (Billboard)	16

== Certifications ==
Region	Certification	Certified units/sales
United States (RIAA)	Platinum	1,000,000^{‡}
^{‡} Sales+streaming figures based on certification alone.

== See also ==
- List of Billboard number-one R&B albums of 2011
- List of number-one rap albums of 2011 (U.S.)
