= An Evening with Jill Scott =

2011–13 concert tour by Jill Scott

- Tour by Jill Scott
- Promotional poster for tour
- Location: Europe; North America; Oceania
- Associated album: The Light of the Sun
- Start date: October 7, 2011
- End date: November 27, 2013
- Legs: 3
- No. of shows: 28

Jill Scott concert chronology
- Summer Block Party (2011); An Evening with Jill Scott (2011–2013); Live in the Moment Tour (2018–2019)

An Evening with Jill Scott was a concert tour by the American recording artist, Jill Scott. Beginning in October 2011, the tour supported her fourth studio album, The Light of the Sun. The tour mainly consisted of Scott performing at music festivals in Europe and North America. For the first time ever, she also toured Australia in 2013. Shows in Europe were known as: Jill Scott: Live in Europe.

== Opening acts ==
- Anthony Hamilton (Tuscaloosa)
- DJ Semtex (London—November 30)
- D'Angelo (Juan-les-Pins)
- Jones Jnr (Australia)

== Tour dates ==
List of 2011 concerts
Date	City	Country	Venue
October 7, 2011	Tuscaloosa	United States	Tuscaloosa Amphitheater
October 8, 2011^{[A]}	Mobile	United States	Bienville Square
October 11, 2011	Baltimore	United States	Modell Performing Arts Center
October 19, 2011	Newark	United States	Prudential Hall
November 23, 2011^{[B]}	Montgomery	United States	Dunn–Oliver Acadome
November 25, 2011	Atlantic City	United States	Borgata Event Center
November 30, 2011	London	England	O_{2} Academy Brixton
December 2, 2011	Manchester	England	O_{2} Apollo Manchester
December 4, 2011	Warsaw	Poland	Congress Hall Auditorium
December 6, 2011	Paris	France	Bataclan
December 8, 2011	Amsterdam	Netherlands	Paradiso

List of 2012 concerts
Date	City	Country	Venue
March 17, 2012^{[C]}	Miami	United States	Sun Life Stadium
June 14, 2012	Chicago	United States	Charter One Pavilion
June 17, 2012	Detroit	United States	Fox Theatre
June 21, 2012	Washington, D.C.	United States	Verizon Center
June 23, 2012	Philadelphia	United States	Mann Center for the Performing Arts
June 24, 2012^{[D]}	Hampton	United States	Hampton Coliseum
June 28, 2012	Thackerville	United States	Global Event Center
June 30, 2012	Atlanta	United States	Chastain Park Amphitheater
July 6, 2012^{[E]}	Rotterdam	Netherlands	Rotterdam Ahoy
July 10, 2012^{[F]}	London	England	Somerset House Courtyard
July 12, 2012	Antibes	France	La Pinède Gould
July 17, 2012	Istanbul	Turkey	Turkcell Kuruçeşme Arena

List of 2013 concerts
Date	City	Country	Venue
November 19, 2013	Melbourne	Australia	Palais Theatre
November 21, 2013	Brisbane	Australia	The Tivoli
November 23, 2013	Sydney	Australia	Enmore Theatre
November 25, 2013	Sydney	Australia	Enmore Theatre
November 27, 2013	Perth	Australia	Astor Theatre

Festivals and other miscellaneous performances
^{A} This concert was a part of "Bayfest"
^{B} This concert was a part of the "ASU Homecoming"
^{C} This concert was a part of "Jazz in the Gardens"
^{D} This concert was a part of the "Hampton Jazz Festival"
^{E} This concert was a part of the "North Sea Jazz Festival"
^{F} This concert was a part of the "Somerset House Summer Series"

Cancellations and rescheduled shows

March 31, 2012	Cape Town, South Africa	Cape Town International Convention Centre	Cancelled. This concert was a part of the "Cape Town International Jazz Festival"
April 29, 2012	New Orleans	Fair Grounds Race Course	Cancelled. This concert was a part of the "New Orleans Jazz & Heritage Festival"
May 19, 2012	Thackerville, Oklahoma	Global Event Center	Rescheduled to June 28, 2012

=== Box office score data ===
Venue	City	Tickets sold / available	Gross revenue
Tuscaloosa Amphitheater	Tuscaloosa	6,134 / 7,043 (87%)	$278,497
