= Blessed (Jill Scott song) =

Single by Jill Scott

from the album The Light of the Sun
- Released: February 28, 2012 (radio)
- Recorded: March 2011
- Genre: R&B; neo soul; psychedelic soul
- Length: 3:38
- Label: Blues Babe, Warner Music Group
- Songwriters: Andre Harris, Vidal Davis, Jill Scott
- Producer: Dre & Vidal

Jill Scott singles chronology
"So Gone (What My Mind Says)" (2011)	"Blessed" (2012)

Music video
- "Blessed" on YouTube

"Blessed" is the fourth single by R&B singer Jill Scott from her #1 album The Light of the Sun. (2011) It was sent to radio on February 28, 2012.

== Song information ==
"Blessed" is the introduction track to The Light of the Sun. An upbeat joint, it signifies Jill's blessings in life such as her beautiful, healthy, son, Jett, her grandmother's longevity, and the presence of her mother and father. It is written by Scott herself along with Andre Harris and Vidal Davis.

== Live performances ==
Scott performed "Blessed" at the 42nd annual NAACP Image Awards. It was performed as an encore song on her 2011 Summer Block Party tour.

== Video ==
The video was shot at a club in February and premiered on VH1 on April 23, 2012.

== Chart performance ==
On the week of March 17, 2012, "Blessed" debuted at #96 on the Billboard's Hot R&B/Hip-Hop Songs. On the week of March 24, it rose to #55. It eventually rose to its current peak at #21. On June 19, 2012, it reached the top spot on the Urban AC charts exactly one year after her Billboard top 10 collaboration, "So in Love" with Anthony Hamilton.

== Charts ==
=== Weekly charts ===
Chart (2012)	Peak position
US Adult R&B Songs (Billboard)	1
US Hot R&B/Hip-Hop Songs (Billboard)	21

=== Year-end charts ===
Chart (2012)	Position
US Hot R&B/Hip-Hop Songs (Billboard)	67
