= Bartz =

Bartz is a German surname. Notable people with the surname include:

- Alexander Bartz (born 1984), German politician
- Carol Bartz (born 1948), American business executive
- Gary Bartz (born 1940), American saxophonist
- Jenny Bartz (born 1955), American swimmer
- Julia Bartz (born 1984), German politician
- Julia Bartz (writer), American writer
- Merlin Bartz (born 1961), American politician
- Randy Bartz (born 1968), American speed skater

== See also ==
- Bartz Klauser, character and main protagonist in the role-playing game Final Fantasy V
- Barz (disambiguation)
