= Tupac Back =

Single by Meek Mill featuring Rick Ross

from the album Self Made Vol. 1
- Released: April 5, 2011
- Recorded: 2011
- Genre: Trap
- Length: 3:56
- Label: Maybach Music Group
- Songwriters: Robert Williams; William Roberts II; Michael Williams II; Marquel Middlebrooks
- Producers: Mike Will Made It; Marz

Meek Mill singles chronology
"Tupac Back" (2011)	"I'm a Boss" (2011)

Rick Ross singles chronology
"John" (2011)	"Tupac Back" (2011)	"I'm a Boss" (2011)

"Tupac Back" is a song by American hip hop recording artist Meek Mill, released as his debut single and the lead single from the Maybach Music Group compilation album, Self Made Vol. 1. The song features MMG label boss and fellow rapper Rick Ross, and peaked at #31 on the Hot R&B/Hip-Hop Songs. Rick Ross said that, in making the song, they were “paying homage to the fallen icon”

== Music video ==
The official music video was released on June 17, 2011, and is directed by Mr. Boomtown. The video was shot on Grape Street in Watts, Los Angeles. It features Rick Ross sitting in the back of his Maybach and Meek Mill "Stranded On Death Row" (a reference to the song "Stranded On Death Row" from The Chronic) in a prison.

== Remixes ==
Numerous unofficial remixes have been released including "Tunechi's Back" by Lil Wayne on his Sorry 4 the Wait mixtape, "Big Pun Back" by Joell Ortiz, "Snapbacks Back" by Tyga with Chris Brown on his mixtape Well Done 2 and Brown's mixtape Boy In Detention, "Biggie Back" by Maino, and UK-based rappers Giggs and Lethal Bizzle released Westwood's back. Lil Wyte also did his own version called "Elvis Back". Fat Joe also released his own freestyle over the beat titled "Dirty Diana." Tupac's protégé's The Outlawz also recorded a remix which had an official video shot with archive footage of Tupac which the video was directed by Iamhaym & Young Noble.

Swizz Beatz released the official remix for his series #MonsterMondays on his website, called "Reebok Back". It features the producer/rapper himself, along with the two original artists on the record. Only the clean version was released.

== Chart positions ==
The song peaked on 31 on the Hot R&B/Hip-Hop Songs and 22 on the Hot Rap Songs. As of August 2013, the song has sold 176,000 copies in the United States.

Chart (2011)	Peak position
US Hot R&B/Hip-Hop Songs	31
US Rap Songs	22
