= Ambition (song) =

Song by Wale featuring Meek Mill and Rick Ross

Song by Wale featuring Meek Mill and Rick Ross

from the album Ambition
- Released: October 28, 2011
- Length: 5:02
- Label: Maybach; Warner
- Songwriters: Olubowale Akintimehin; Robert Williams; William Roberts II; Tyler Williams; Ernest Price
- Producer: T-Minus

Music video
- "Ambition" on YouTube

"Ambition" is a song by American rapper Wale featuring American rappers Meek Mill and Rick Ross. It was released on October 28, 2011, as a track from Wale's second studio album Ambition (2011). The song was produced by T-Minus.

== Background ==
In an interview with Complex in October 2011, Wale spoke about the song:

"Ambition" is a record that's on the album that's very important because it's the title track. The most famous rapper on the album is obviously Rick Ross, so I wanted him to bring a lot of attention to "Ambition" because it's what the album is about. I also wanted my fans to hear another side of Rick Ross. He touches on some things that he never really spoke on before on that verse."

== Critical reception ==
The song was met with generally positive reviews from music critics. Rose Lilah of HotNewHipHop described it as "a solid addition to the commendable body of work Wale has been creating since stepping foot in the rap game". XXL called the song a "smooth, rolling opus".

== Music video ==
The official music video was released on March 13, 2012. It sees the three rappers on a downtown Miami rooftop and wearing leather jackets, while also showing flashbacks of Meek Mill and Rick Ross in the past.

== Charts ==
Chart (2011)	Peak position
US Billboard Hot 100	81

== Certifications ==
Region	Certification	Certified units/sales
Canada (Music Canada)	Gold	40,000^{‡}
United States (RIAA)	Platinum	1,000,000^{‡}
^{‡} Sales+streaming figures based on certification alone.
