= Helmut Thielicke =

German theologian (1908–1986)

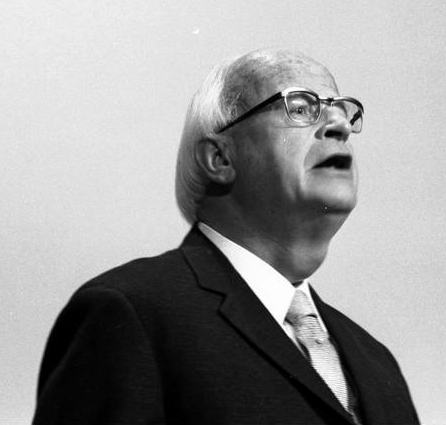
Helmut Thielicke

Helmut Thielicke (German: [ˈhɛlmuːt ˈtiːlɪkə]; 4 December 1908 in Wuppertal – 5 March 1986 in Hamburg) was a German Protestant theologian and rector of the University of Hamburg from 1960 to 1978.

== Biography ==
Thielicke grew up in Wuppertal, where he went to a humanistic Gymnasium and took his Abitur in 1928. After this he began to study philosophy and theology in Erlangen, but soon had to undergo an operation on his thyroid. Despite the negative outcome of this operation (pulmonary embolism, tetanus), which were still causing complications 4 years later, he finished his studies and in 1932 he got his doctorate in philosophy with "Das Verhältnis zwischen dem Ethischen und dem Ästhetischen" (The relationship between the ethical and the aesthetic).

After his health improved, Thielicke listened to Karl Barth in Bonn, whom he criticized, mainly because of Barth's exclusion of natural anthropology. Eventually he did his doctor's degree in theology in 1934 with a work under the supervision of Paul Althaus in Erlangen. He took his postdoctoral lecture qualification with "Offenbarung, Vernunft und Existenz. Studien zur Religionsphilosophie Lessings" (Revelation, reason and existence; studies in Lessing's religious philosophy) in 1935 under the growing pressure of the Nazi-Regime, which refused him an appointment to Erlangen in view of his activity within the "Confessing Church". In 1936 he obtained a professorship in systematic theology in Heidelberg, where he met Marie-Luise Herrmann, to whom he was married in 1937. They had four children.

After repeated interrogations by the Gestapo from the mid-1930s onwards, he was finally dismissed in 1940. Thielicke was conscripted, but nine months later he was able to take over a church in Ravensburg with the help of regional bishop Theophil Wurm. In 1942 he assumed theological office in Stuttgart, from where he delivered numerous sermons and went on lecture tours, continually made difficult by the government by means of bans on travel, publication and preaching. Thielicke published a critique of Bultmann's composition about the demythologisation of the New Testament, which gave rise to a respectful, but inconclusive correspondence between the two. He also contacted the resistance group Freiburger Kreis, but without working actively in their plans for a revolution. Hoping to promote Christian democracy in postwar Germany, he proposed a plan in 1942 that led to the establishment of the first Evangelical Academy in Bad Boll in 1945.

The bombing of Stuttgart in 1944 forced Thielicke and his family to go to Korntal, where he continued his lecture tours and preaching services in the following years; these were anonymously translated into many languages in Switzerland and read on various fronts of the war. Immediately after the end of the war Thielicke traveled with a group of delegates to Frankfurt, where he was invited by the government to participate in talks regarding the resumption of academic work to fill the political and academic vacuum of the postwar period. As a consequence, he took over a professorship at the newly reopened theological faculty in Tübingen in 1947, being made administrative head of the university and President of the Chancellor's Conference in 1951. In 1954, continuing his postwar efforts to revive Germany's academic and spiritual heritage, he accepted a call to Hamburg to found a new theological faculty, where he acted as both dean and professor while also pastoring the main church of Hamburg, St. Michaelis.

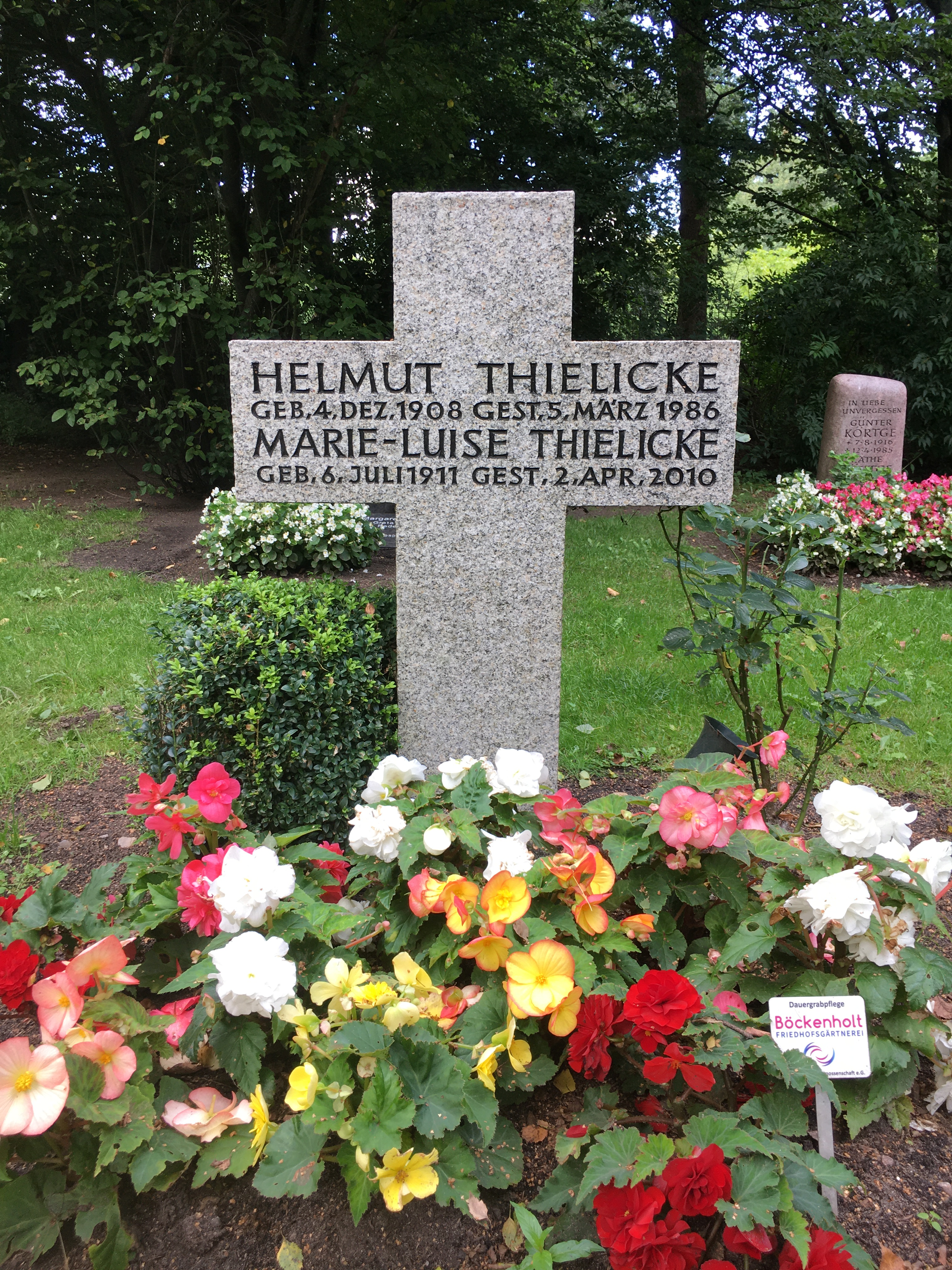
Grave.

He met with Billy Graham and was received by President Jimmy Carter during lecture tours in the United States in 1977. Thielicke also traveled to Asia, South Africa, Latin America, Australia and New Zealand in the 1960s and 1970s.

Thielicke died 1986 in Hamburg, aged 77.

== Selected English translations of works by Thielicke ==
- Notes from a Wayfarer; the Autobiography of Helmut Thielicke Translated by David R. Law. New York: Paragon House, 1995. ISBN 1-55778-708-5
- A Little Exercise for Young Theologians Translated by Charles L. Taylor. Foreword by Martin E. Marty. Grand Rapids, MI: Eerdmans, 1962.
- Man in God's World Translated and edited by John W. Doberstein. New York: Harper & Row, 1963.
- Nihilism: Its Origin and Nature -- With a Christian Answer Translated by John W. Doberstein. Westport, CT: Greenwood, 1961.
- Between God and Satan Translated by C.C. Barber. Edinburgh: Oliver and Boyd, 1958. [Republished: Farmington Hills, MI: Oil Lamp Books, 2010; ISBN 978-0-9844917-1-1]
- Theological Ethics Translated by William H. Lazareth. Philadelphia: Fortress Press, 1966-69.
- The Waiting Father: Sermons on the Parables of Jesus Translated by John W. Doberstein. New York: Harper & Row, 1959.
- Encounter with Spurgeon Translated by John W. Doberstein. Philadelphia: Fortress Press, 1963.
- How the World Began: Man in the First Chapters of the Bible Translated with an introduction by John W. Doberstein. Philadelphia: Muhlenberg, 1961.
- The Ethics of Sex Translated by John W. Doberstein. New York: Harper & Row, 1964.
- Faith, the Great Adventure Translated by David L. Schmidt. Philadelphia: Fortress Press, 1985.
- The Freedom of the Christian Man: A Christian Confrontation with the Secular Gods Translated by John W. Doberstein. New York: Harper & Row, 1963.
- The Hidden Question of God Translated by Geoffrey W. Bromiley. Grand Rapids, MI: Eerdmans, 1977.
- Christ and the Meaning of Life: A Book of Sermons and Meditations Translated by John W. Doberstein. New York: Harper & Row, 1962.
- Our Heavenly Father: Sermons on the Lord's Prayer Translated by John W. Doberstein. New York: Harper & Row, 1960.
- The Silence of God Translated with an introduction by Geoffrey W. Bromiley. Grand Rapids, MI: Eerdmans, 1962. [Republished: Farmington Hills, MI: Oil Lamp Books, 2010; ISBN 978-0-9844917-0-4]
- Life Can Begin Again: Sermons on the Sermon on the Mount Translated by John W. Doberstein. Philadelphia: Fortress Press, 1963.
- Between Heaven and Earth: Conversations with American Christians Translated and edited by John W. Doberstein. Westport, CT: Greenwood, 1975, 1965.
- I Believe: the Christian's Creed Translated by John W. Doberstein and H. George Anderson. Philadelphia: Fortress Press, 1968.
- How to Believe Again Translated by H. George Anderson. Philadelphia: Fortress Press, 1972.
- The Evangelical Faith Translated and edited by Geoffrey W. Bromiley, 3 vols. Grand Rapids, MI: Eerdmans, 1974-1977.
- Modern Faith and Thought Translated by Geoffrey W. Bromiley. Grand Rapids, MI: Eerdmans, 1990.
- Living With Death Translated by Geoffrey W. Bromiley. Grand Rapids, MI: Eerdmans, 1983.
- Being Human -- Becoming Human: An Essay in Christian Anthropology Translated by Geoffrey W. Bromiley. Garden City: Doubleday, 1984.
- Being Christian When the Chips are Down Translated by H. George Anderson. Philadelphia: Fortress Press, 1979.
- How Modern Should Theology Be? Translated by H. George Anderson. Philadelphia: Fortress Press, 1969.
- The Trouble With The Church: A Call For Renewal London: Hodder & Stoughton, 1965.

== Sources ==
- "Helmut Thielicke," Contemporary Authors Online. The Gale Group, 2000
- Cunningham, Lawrence S. (January 12, 1996). "Notes From a Wayfarer (review)". Commonweal. 123 (1): 27.
- Marvin J. Dirks, Laymen Look at Preaching: Lay Expectation Factors in Relation to the Preaching of Helmut Thielicke, Christopher Pub. House (North Quincy, MA), 1972.
- Steve Schroeder, "Notes From a Wayfarer (review)," Booklist, June 1, 1995 v91 n19-20 p1698(1)
