= The Light of the Sun =

Studio album by Jill Scott
- Released: June 21, 2011
- Genre: Neo soul
- Length: 59:18
- Labels: Blue Babe; Warner Bros.
- Producers: Adam Blackstone; Randy Bowland; Warryn Campbell; Aaron Draper; Dre & Vidal; JR Hutson; John Lawson; Malski; Khari Mateen; George "Spanky" McCurdy; Jill Scott; Weatherbe; Kelvin Woote

Jill Scott chronology
Live in Paris+ (2008)	The Light of the Sun (2011)	The Original Jill Scott from the Vault, Vol. 1 (2011)

Singles from The Light of the Sun
- 1. "So in Love" Released: April 26, 2011; 2. "Shame" Released: June 1, 2011; 3. "So Gone (What My Mind Says)" Released: October 2011; 4. "Blessed" Released: February 28, 2012

The Light of the Sun is the fourth studio album by American singer Jill Scott. It was released on June 21, 2011, by Scott's imprint label, Blue Babe Records. Recorded after Scott's four-year break from her music career and departure from her former label, Hidden Beach Recordings, The Light of the Sun was recorded at several studios and produced primarily by Scott and JR Hutson, a songwriter and producer who had previously worked on her 2007 record The Real Thing: Words and Sounds Vol. 3.

The album received positive reviews from most critics. Music journalists noted The Light of the Sun for its neo soul sound, element of improvisation, and Scott's themes of emotion and womanhood. It debuted at number one on the US Billboard 200 in the United States, where it sold 135,000 copies in its first week. The album became Scott's first American number-one record, and by March 2015, it had sold 478,000 copies in the US. The Light of the Sun was promoted with three singles: "So in Love", "So Gone (What My Mind Says)", and "Blessed". Scott also promoted the album with her Summer Block Party concert tour.

== Background ==
Following her 2007 album, The Real Thing: Words and Sounds Vol. 3, Scott took a break from recording music. She undertook acting roles in the movies Tyler Perry's Why Did I Get Married? and Hounddog, and she had a starring role in the television series The No. 1 Ladies' Detective Agency. During her break, she divorced her husband of six years Lyzel Williams in 2007, became engaged to the former drummer Lil' John Roberts in 2008, gave birth to their son Jett Hamilton in 2009, and broke up with Roberts. Scott subsequently began sessions for The Light of the Sun.

In 2009, Scott left her former record label Hidden Beach Recordings. During the album's recording, she was sued by Hidden Beach, which claimed she had left without fulfilling a six-album contract. The lawsuit was settled in 2011, with Hidden Beach planning to release the compilation album The Original Jill Scott from the Vault, Vol. 1 in August, the first in a planned album series of Scott's previously unreleased recordings. In 2010, Warner Bros. Records signed Scott to a deal that gave her direct control over her marketing and promotion. In a strategy to re-establish Scott's presence with fans, she signed a multi-tour deal with Live Nation/Haymon Ventures to expand her concert touring. Scott co-headlined a national, 20-date arena tour with the recording artist Maxwell, called Maxwell & Jill Scott: The Tour, in 2010.

== Recording and composition ==
The album was recorded at several recording studios, including Fever Recording Studios in North Hollywood, 9th Street Studios and Threshold Sound & Vision in Santa Monica, Studio 609 and The Studio in Philadelphia, The Boom Boom Room in Burbank and The Village Studios in West Los Angeles. Scott worked with producers Terry Lewis, JR Hutson and Justice League for the album. Scott had first worked with Hutson on her previous album The Real Thing.

In an interview for HitQuarters, Hutson said of Scott's approach to The Light of the Sun, "She's now in charge of a lot of different things and with it comes a lot of trials and tribulations, and I think her goal is to just give people a very realistic glimpse of where she is in her life right now." Scott has noted songs such as "Hear My Call" and "Quick" as reflective of the "darkest moments" in her life and has said that much of the album's music developed from studio jams and freestyle sessions. In an interview for Metro, she said of the "largely improvised" recording process:

I went into a studio with no lyrics, nothing written out. I got together a great group – featuring Adam Blackstone on bass and Randy Bowland on guitar – and just put them in a studio and got them to play while I improvised lyrics. From the first note, you could hear little tunes emerging, and that would inspire me to freestyle lyrics. We call it 'going in'. You go inside yourself, inside your spirit, and you explore. It's exhausting. When we were done, there was a lot of whooping and hugging and high-fiving. It's that kind of record.

== Release and promotion ==
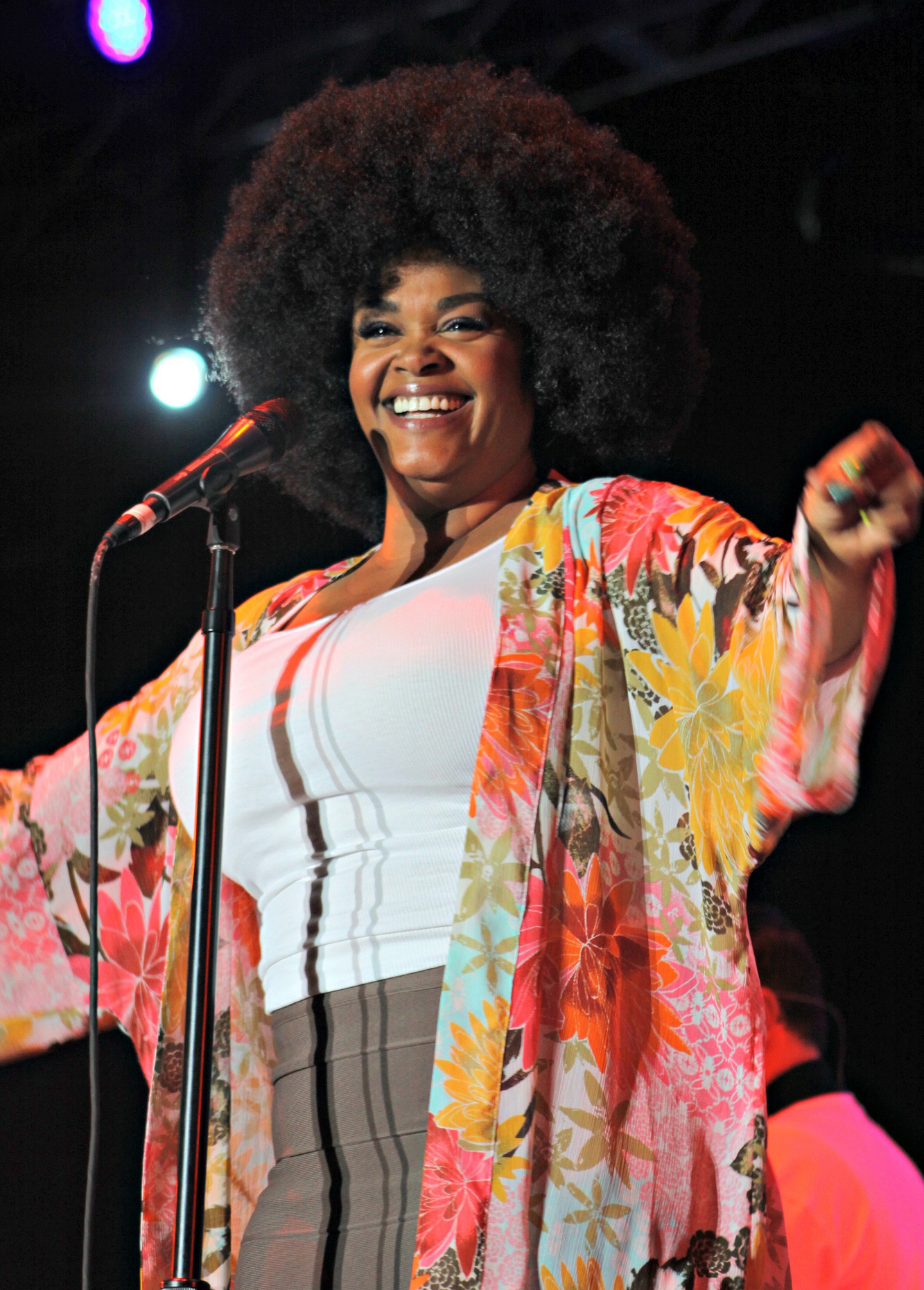
Scott in concert in 2012

The album was released in the United States on June 21, 2011, on Scott's own imprint label, Blues Babe Records, distributed by Warner Bros. Records, her first release by the label. It is the first release under the distribution deal between Blues Babe and Warner Bros. It was released on June 27 in the United Kingdom. In the first week of release, the album debuted at number one on the Billboard 200, selling 135,000 copies in the US. It was her first number-one album there. It sold 55,000 copies the following week, and by May 2015, it had sold 479,000 copies.

The album's first single, "So in Love" featuring Anthony Hamilton, was released on June 26. It spent nine weeks on the US Billboard Hot R&B/Hip-Hop Songs, peaking at number 10 on the chart, one week on the Billboard Hot 100, peaking at number 97, and three weeks on Billboard's Radio Songs, peaking at number 71 on the chart. The song also charted in Japan, peaking at number 68. This had been preceded by the April release of "Shame" on Scott's SoundCloud account, featuring rapper Eve and vocal ensemble The A Group. Its music video was filmed at the Cecil B. Moore Recreational Center in Philadelphia, where Eve and the rapper Black Thought were in attendance. Scott said in an interview for CNN that she spent several summers at the recreation center and that it was at risk of being demolished. The video was premiered on April 13 on Essence.com. It was later released as the album's second single in the United Kingdom.

The second single "So Gone (What My Mind Says)" was released in October 2011, and has peaked at #28 on the U.S. Billboard Hot R&B/Hip-Hop Songs charts and #7 on the Adult Contemporary Charts. On August 26, 2011, a tour video of "So Gone" was released featuring a live performance of the song. On October 27, 2011, Scott released a music video, with Paul Wall playing a role the gentleman from the Diamond Chip Dick company. She told rap-up.com, that the song is about a "girl who is being celibate because she's respecting herself and trying to do something completely different. In the meantime, she's still a boss and she could use a little [sex]. She gets a phone call from her girlfriend who says, 'Why don't you call Diamond Chip Dick?' Diamond Chip Dick is a service where they come and please you and take the trash out when they leave. But it's too good. She's gotten Dickmatized."

Scott promoted the album with her Summer Block Party concert tour, beginning on July 28, 2012, and concluding on August 28. The tour featured Anthony Hamilton and Mint Condition as opening acts, Doug E. Fresh as a host, and Jazzy Jeff as the DJ. Scott also promoted the album with performances on the television shows The Tonight Show with Jay Leno, Jimmy Kimmel Live! and Live with Regis and Kelly. She headlined the Essence Music Festival on July 1. On December 18, Scott co-headlined VH1 Divas Celebrates Soul alongside Mary J. Blige, Jennifer Hudson, Kelly Clarkson, Florence + the Machine, and Jessie J, performing "Hear My Call" and collaborating with The Roots and Erykah Badu on "You Got Me."

== Critical reception ==
Professional ratings
Aggregate scores
Source	Rating
AnyDecentMusic?	6.5/10
Metacritic	73/100
Review scores
Source	Rating
AllMusic	4/5 stars
Entertainment Weekly	B+
The Guardian	4/5 stars
The Independent	2/5 stars
MSN Music (Expert Witness)	A−
Paste	9/10
Rolling Stone	3/5 stars
Slant Magazine	3.5/5 stars
Time Out	4/5 stars
Uncut	3/5 stars

The Light of the Sun received generally positive reviews from critics. At Metacritic, which assigns a normalized rating out of 100 to reviews from mainstream publications, the album received an average score of 73, based on 15 reviews. Mikael Wood from Entertainment Weekly complimented its "earnest introspection and earthy textures", and observed "a distinctly early-aughties vibe". In The New York Times, Jon Pareles praised Scott's "proudly and forthrightly feminine" themes and said the songs are "springy with a sense of improvisation, both in the rhythms and in their elaborate vocal overlays". The Washington Post's Bill Friskics-Warren noted its "sumptuous orchestration, jazzy flourishes and neo-soul beats", and wrote, "The full range of human emotion, from defiance to hurt and hope, is expressed over the course of the album." AllMusic's Thom Jurek said that "Scott sounds more in control than ever; her spoken and sung phrasing (now a trademark), songwriting, and production instincts are all solid". In the Chicago Tribune, Greg Kot wrote, "She's perfected a style that toggles between singing and conversing, and balances more conventional pop structure with spontaneity." Caroline Sullivan in The Guardian noted its "uplifting sung-spoken pieces" and wrote, "It's Scott's warm womanliness over the whole album that makes it a must-hear."

In a mixed review, Andy Gill from The Independent criticized Scott's lyrics as "a sticky puddle of self-regard" and found its songs "[un]developed much beyond a languid soul–jazz vamp". Rolling Stone writer Jon Dolan gave the album three out of five stars and called her "trademark" musical style "warm and inviting, if rarely thrilling, neo-soul". Daryl Easlea of BBC Online wrote that it "at times [...] veers towards self-indulgence, and some of its ideas are not fully followed through", but complimented its "freewheeling vibe" and called it "a lovely, bittersweet album that celebrates the joy of life".

== Track listing ==
The Light of the Sun track listing
No.	Title	Writer(s)	Producer(s)	Length
1.	"Blessed"	Jill Scott; Andre Harris; Vidal Davis	Dre & Vidal	3:28
2.	"So in Love" (featuring Anthony Hamilton)	Scott; Kelvin Wooten; Hamilton; Lee Hutson Jr.	Wooten	4:36
3.	"Shame" (featuring Eve and The A Group)	Scott; Hutson; Eve Jihan Jeffers	JR Hutson	3:33
4.	"All Cried Out Redux" (featuring Doug E. Fresh)	Full Force; Scott; Barry Moody; Hutson	Scott	2:59
5.	"Le BOOM Vent Suite"	Scott; Adam Blackstone; Randy Bowland; George "Spanky" McCurdy; Eric Wortham	Scott; Hutson; Blackstone^{[a]}; Bowland^{[a]}; McCurdy^{[a]}; Wortham^{[a]}	9:01
6.	"So Gone (What My Mind Says)" (featuring Paul Wall)	Scott; Hutson; Jairus Mozee; Paris Strother; Paul Slayton	Hutson	4:40
7.	"Hear My Call"	Scott; Hutson	Hutson	3:48
8.	"Some Other Time"	Scott; Khari Mateen; Karl Jenkins	Mateen	2:18
9.	"Quick"	Scott; Warryn Campbell	Campbell	1:50
10.	"Making You Wait"	Scott; Hutson	Hutson	4:08
11.	"Until Then (I Imagine)"	Scott; Campbell	Campbell	3:41
12.	"Missing You"	Scott; Hutson; Mozee; Ricky Pageot	Hutson	4:13
13.	"When I Wake Up"	Scott; Blackstone; Bowland; James Darrell Robinson; Wortham	Scott; Hutson; Blackstone^{[a]}; Bowland^{[a]}; Robinson^{[a]}; Wortham^{[a]}	4:13
14.	"Womanifesto"	Scott	Scott	2:03
15.	"Rolling Hills"	Scott; Blackstone; Bowland; McCurdy; Wortham	Scott; Blackstone; Bowland; McCurdy; Wortham; Hutson^{[a]}	4:47

iTunes deluxe edition – bonus tracks
No.	Title	Writer(s)	Producer(s)	Length
16.	"The Light of the Sun"	Scott; Jamal McCoy	Malski	6:26
17.	"Love Soul Bounce"	Scott; McCoy	Malski	3:34
18.	"I Love You"	Scott; John Lawson; Aaron Draper; Christopher Weatherbe; Dominick Weatherbe	Lawson; Draper; C. Weatherbe; D. Weatherbe	2:56

Target deluxe edition – bonus tracks
No.	Title	Writer(s)	Producer(s)	Length
16.	"Escape"	Scott; Campbell	Campbell	3:25
17.	"Easy"	Scott; Hutson	Hutson	3:48

Notes

- ^{^a} signifies a co-producer

== Personnel ==
Credits are adapted from the album's liner notes.

- The A Group – background vocals
- Nathaniel Alford – engineer
- Yameen Allworld – background vocals
- Sherlen Archibald – publicity
- Ashaunna Ayars – marketing
- Todd Bergman – assistant
- Michelle Bishop – violin
- Adam Blackstone – bass guitar, electric bass, keyboards, producer
- Randy Bowland – 7-string electric guitar, guitar, producer
- Bruce Buechner – engineer, production engineer
- Luke Burland – publicity
- Sandra Campbell – project coordinator
- Warryn Campbell – instrumentation, producer, programming, vocal arrangement
- Chris Chambers – publicity
- Jeff Chestek – string engineer
- Sean Cooper – sound design
- Eli Davis – production coordination
- Kimre Davis – production coordination
- Aaron Draper – background vocals, percussion
- Dré – producer
- Corte Ellis – background vocals
- Luis Eric – horn
- Teresa Evans – production coordination
- Rick Friedrick – assistant
- Larry Gold – string arrangements, string conductor
- Steven Gomillion – photography
- Robert Greene – make-up
- Bernie Grundman – mastering
- Andre Harris – engineer
- Donald Hayes – horn
- J.R. Hutson – A&R, background vocals, engineer, executive producer, instrumentation, keyboards, producer, scratching
- Bruce Irvine – engineer
- Liza Joseph – A&R
- Brandon Kilgour – engineer
- Emma Kummrow – violin
- Dennis Leupold – photography
- Damien Lewis – assistant
- Jennie Lorenzo – cello
- Glen Marchese – engineer, mixing
- Khari Mateen – instrumentation, producer
- Luigi Mazzocchi – violin
- George "Spanky" McCurdy – drums, producer
- Susan Moses – stylist
- Jairus Mozee – bass, guitar
- Peter Nocella – viola
- Rickey Pageot – keyboards
- Charles Parker – violin
- Vanessa Parr – engineer
- Dave Pensado – mixing
- Rebecca Proudfoot – A&R
- Zachariah Redding – assistant
- Lacy Redway – hair stylist
- Tim Reid – marketing
- James Chul Rim – engineer, vocal engineer
- "V" Roane – background vocals
- John Roberts – drums, horn
- Montez Roberts – assistant engineer, engineer
- James Darrell Robinson – drums, producer
- Eric Rousseau – sound design
- Jill Scott – A&R, art direction, background vocals, executive producer, producer, vocal arrangement
- Phillip "Logann" Scott III – engineer
- Paris Strother – keyboards
- Sean Tallman – engineer
- Phil Tan – mixing
- Vidal – producer
- Courtney Walter – design
- Ayana Webb – background vocals
- Kelvin Wooten – bass guitar, drum programming, guitar, keyboards, piano, producer
- Eric Wortham – keyboards, producer

== Charts ==
=== Weekly charts ===
Weekly chart performance for The Light of the Sun
Album charts (2011)	Peak position
Belgian Albums (Ultratop Wallonia)	99
Canadian Albums (Nielsen SoundScan)	83
Dutch Albums (Album Top 100)	51
French Albums (SNEP)	103
UK Albums (Official Charts)	69
UK R&B Albums (Official Charts)	14
US Billboard 200	1
US Top R&B/Hip-Hop Albums (Billboard)	1

"So in Love" (2011)	Peak position
Japan (Japan Hot 100)	68
South Korea International (Circle)	36
US Billboard Hot 100	97
US Hot R&B/Hip-Hop Songs (Billboard)	10

"So Gone" (2011)	Peak position
US Adult R&B Songs (Billboard)	7
US Hot R&B/Hip-Hop Songs (Billboard)	28

=== Year-end charts ===
2011 year-end chart performance for The Light of the Sun
Album charts (2011)	Position
US Billboard 200	80
US Top R&B/Hip-Hop Albums (Billboard)	22

2012 year-end chart performance for The Light of the Sun
Album charts (2012)	Position
US Top R&B/Hip-Hop Albums (Billboard)	67

"So in Love" (2011)	Position
US Hot R&B/Hip-Hop Songs (Billboard)	23

"So Gone" (2012)	Position
US Hot R&B/Hip-Hop Songs (Billboard)	99

== See also ==
- List of Billboard 200 number-one albums of 2011
- List of Billboard number-one R&B albums of 2011
