= Evangelical Academy =

An evangelical academy is a Protestant Christian conference center in Germany which bridges church and world by offering thematic, open discussions on contemporary social, economic, political and scientific questions.

The evangelical academy movement arose after the Second World War in response to the moral collapse of German society. Helmut Thielicke and Eberhard Müller worked out the practical framework in 1945. Loosely modeled on Plato's academy, the academies emphasized dialogue over didacticism. The first academy in Germany was founded in Bad Boll in 1945. The movement spread quickly throughout Germany, although academies in East Germany experienced political discrimination. The academies supported nascent West German democracy by providing open, ideologically-neutral forums for conversations between opposing interest groups. The Christian dimension of the academies was made unobtrusive to encourage participation by alienated Christians. Since leaders found it difficult to offer quality conferences on every topic of contemporary societal interest, many specialized in the arts, sciences, or politics. While most academies developed official ties with the ecclesiastical structures in their states, relations between local churches and academies frequently remained distant.

During the 1960s Some argued that the academies should not remain neutral with regard to social questions but should take the side of the oppressed. Others held that this proposed change violated the movement's open spirit. Evangelical academies continue to flourish in contemporary Germany.

== Bibliography ==
- Hermann Boventer, ed., Evangelische und Katholische Akademien (Paderborn: Ferdinand, Schöningh, 1983)
- Rulf Jürgen Treidel, Evangelische Akademien im Nachkriegsdeutschland (Stuttgart: Kohlhammer, 2001)
