= Monika Barz =

German university teacher

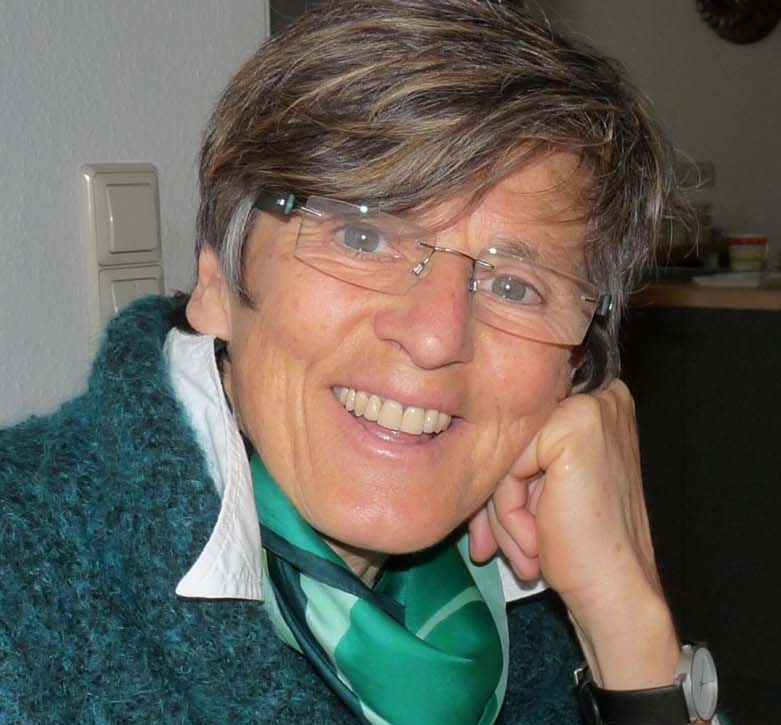
Monika Barz in 2012

Monika Barz (born 5 April 1953) is a German academic. She was Professor for Women and Gender Studies at the Protestant University of applied sciences Ludwigsburg (Evangelische Hochschule Ludwigsburg) in Ludwigsburg between 1993 and 2016. She is known in Germany as a pioneering campaigner for feminist causes, including lesbian rights.

== Life ==
Monika Barz was born in Castrop-Rauxel, near Dortmund. Her early training was in Mathematics and in Sports Education, after which she became a lower and middle school teacher. She studied for her degree level teaching qualification at the University of Tübingen. She then received her doctorate from Leibniz University Hannover with a dissertation concerned with the situations of lesbian women in the churches.

After this, based in Loccum (to the north of Hannover) she spent many years working in adult education and women's education, also involving herself in local politics. She became involved in the German women's movement. She was a co-founder of the Women's refuge in Tübingen and of an emergency helpline for assaulted women operated from Nienburg/Weser. In 1985 she joined with Herta Leistner and Ute Wild to organise what became the first of a succession of annual lesbian meetings at the Evangelical Academy in Bad Boll, and was then one of the organisers of the event each year till 1997.

In 1987 Barz, Leistner and Wild published the book "„Hättest Du gedacht, dass wir so viele sind? Lesbische Frauen in der Kirche." ("Would you have thought that there are so many of us lesbian women in the church?"). Taken together, the book and the annual Bad Boll lesbian meetings triggered a response across the German speaking world: the annual meetings became a protected space in which lesbian churchwomen were able, for the first time, to create networks and collaborative quasi-political structures. New groupings emerged such as LUK ("Lesbians and the church"), the MuM ("Mary and Martha network") in Bad Boll, and later the "Labrystheia" and NKL ("Network of Catholic Lesbians") networks. In 2012 Monika Barz was herself a co-founder of the LSBTTIQ Baden-Württemberg network which drew together around 100 organisations and initiatives from the LGBT sector in the region.

Between 1993 and 2016 Monika Barz was employed as a professor at the Protestant University of applied sciences ("Evangelische Hochschule") in Ludwigsburg where she taught "Theory and Practice of Social Work with Girls and Women". The focus of her research work was on Women's and Gender studies.

Between 1995 and 2013 she served on the executive of the Equality Welfare Association ("Paritätische Wohlfahrtsverband") for Baden-Württemberg: during 2014 and 2015 she served on its supervisory council. For her years of commitment and dedication she was honoured in 2016 with the "Golden pin-badge" ("Goldene Ehrennadel").

== Politics ==
From 1985 till 1993 Monika Barz was a local councillor in Nienburg/Weser, representing the little known (even in Lower Saxony) "Voters' Initiative for Democracy and Environmental Protection" ("Wähler- und Wählerinnen Initiative für Demokratie und Umweltschutz" / WIDU) party. In 2016 she stood for election to the Bundestag as a candidate for the German Green Party, but it appears to have been her first step into mainstream national politics at this level, and her name was too far down on the party list for her to stand a realistic chance of election.
