= List of Billboard 200 number-one albums of 2011 =

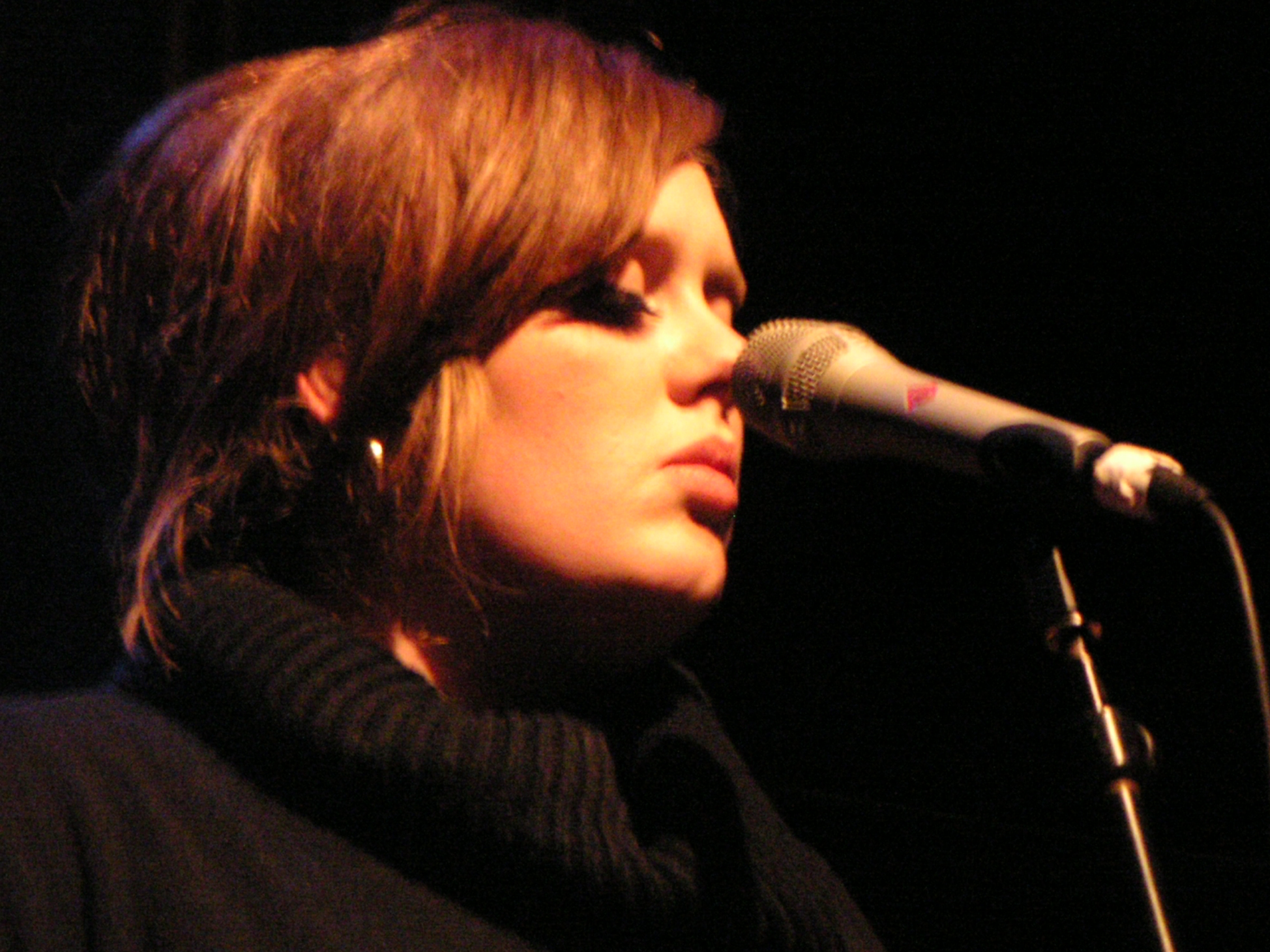
Adele's second studio album, 21, was the most successful and highest-selling album of 2011, spending 13 non-consecutive weeks at number one.

The highest-selling albums and EPs in the United States are ranked in the Billboard 200 chart, which is published by Billboard magazine. The data are compiled by Nielsen Soundscan based on each album's weekly physical and digital sales. In 2011, 30 albums advanced to the peak position of the chart.

Singer-songwriter Taylor Swift's Speak Now was the first album to reach the top in 2011, spending four consecutive weeks at the top with 259,000 copies sold, while Michael Bublé's Christmas was the last album to do so, also spending four consecutive weeks there and selling 448,000 copies. The most successful album of the year was Adele's 21, which spent 13 non-consecutive weeks at number one, and sold 5 million copies. The Billboard magazine mentioned 21 as the highest-selling album in the year since 2004, when Usher's Confessions reached sales of 8 million copies. Lady Gaga's Born This Way held the record for the highest first-week total in 2011, with 1,108,000 copies sold in its first week. Lil Wayne's Tha Carter IV had the second-highest first-week total in 2011, with 964,000 copies.

== Chart history ==
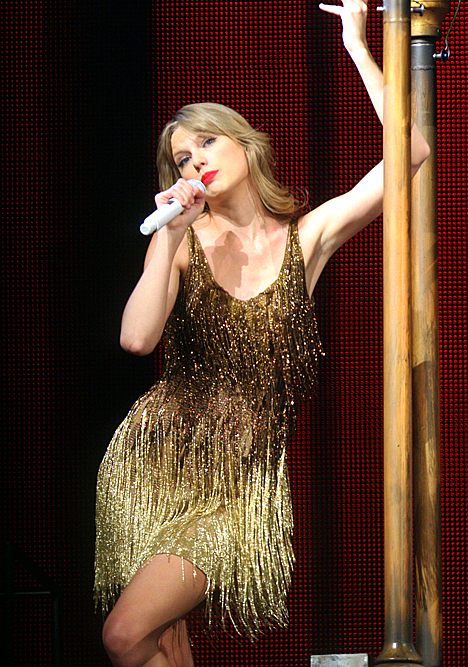
Taylor Swift's 2010 album Speak Now was the first number-one of 2011. It spent four consecutive weeks at the top.

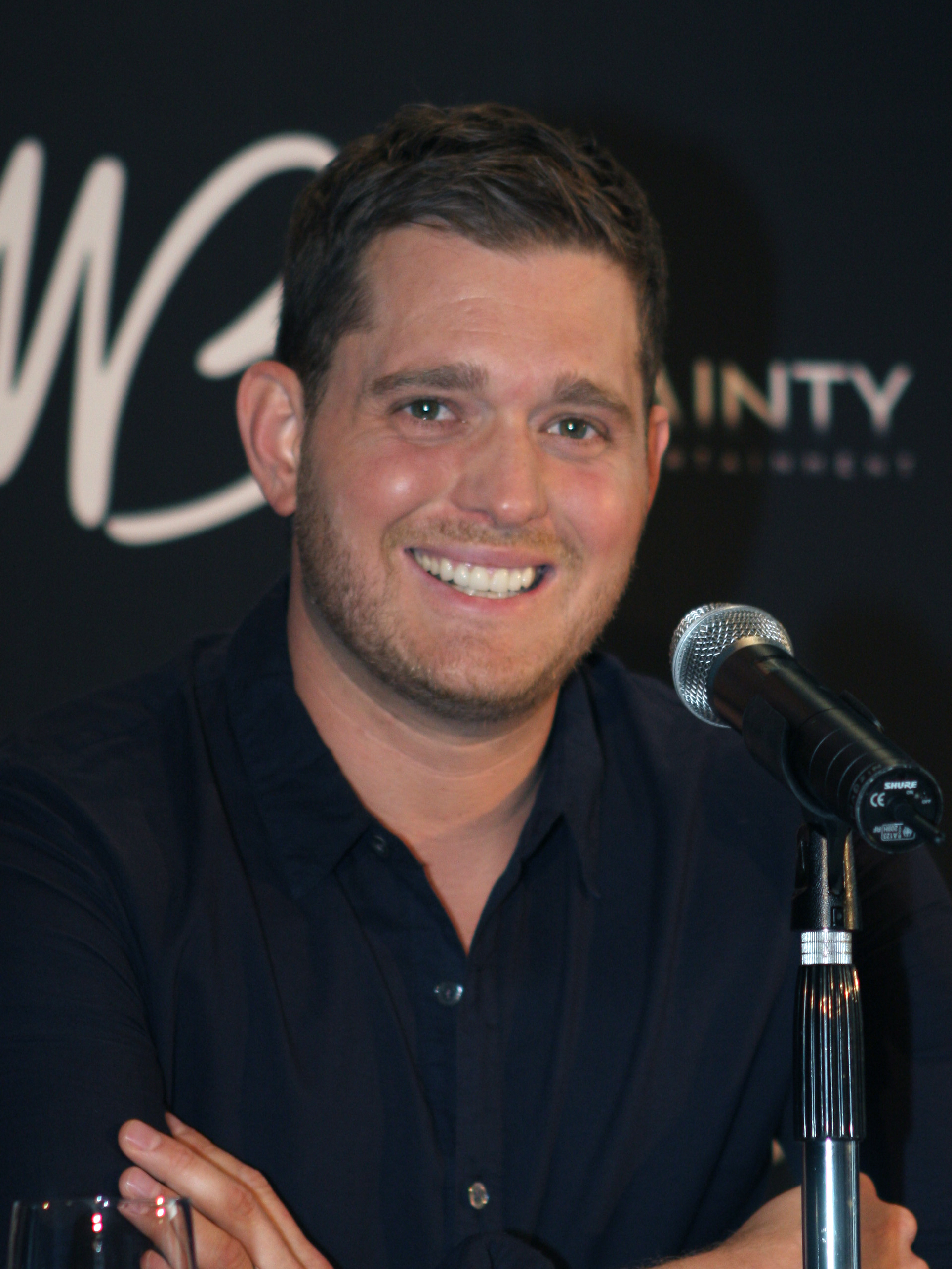
Michael Bublé's Christmas was the last number-one album of the year, with four consecutive weeks atop the chart.

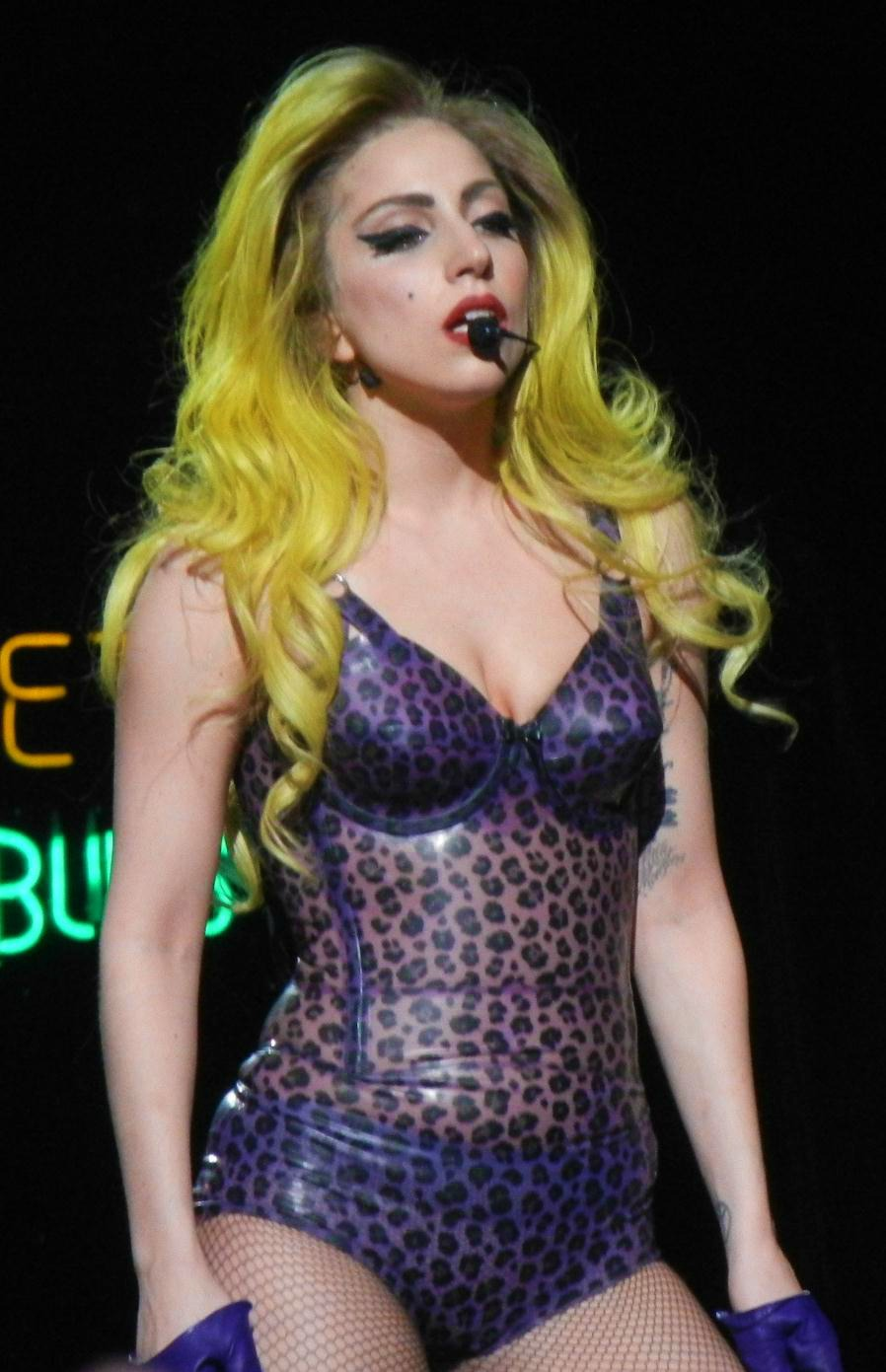
Born This Way by Lady Gaga scored the biggest sales week of 2011, opening with 1,108,000 copies sold.

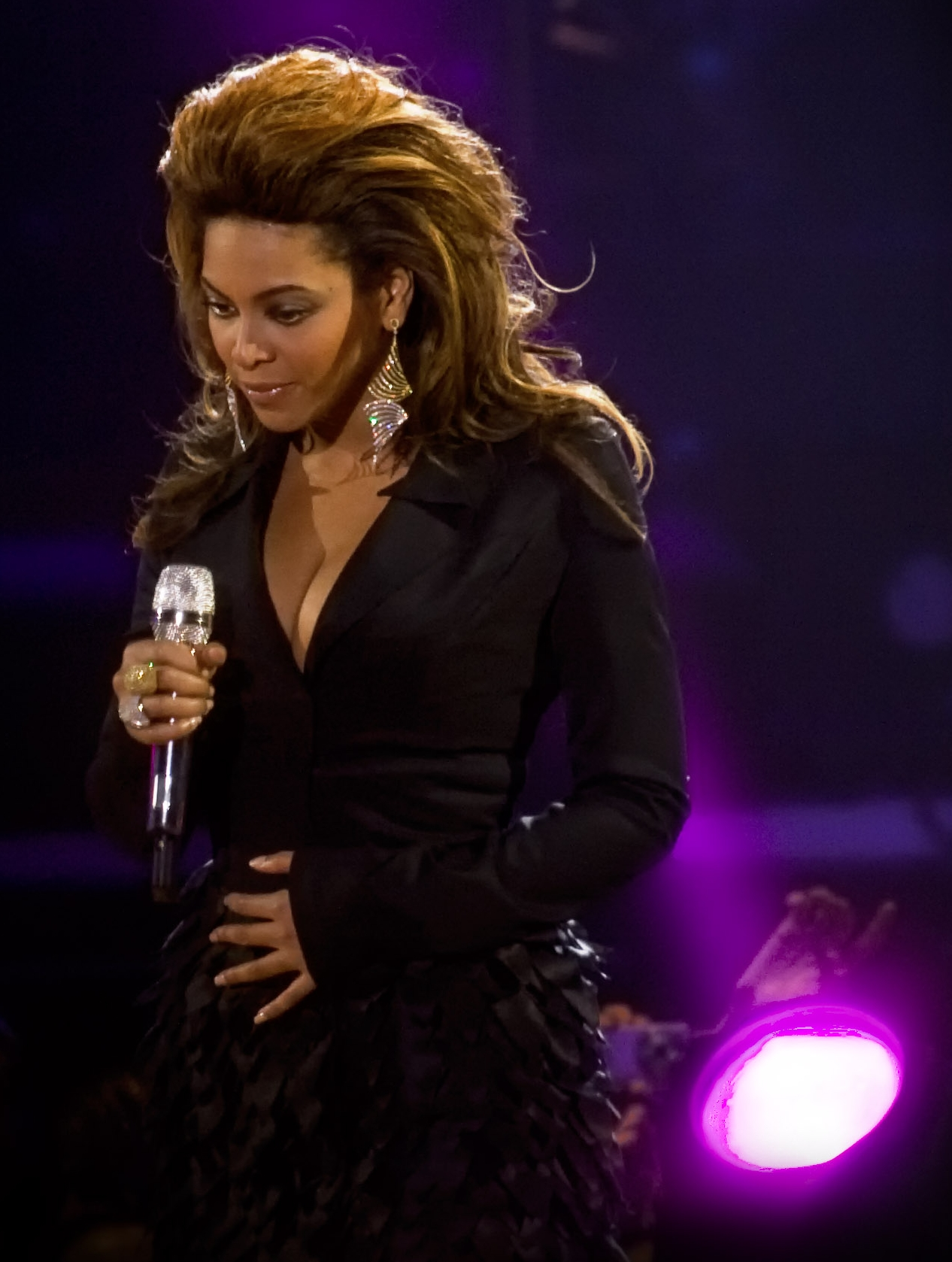
Beyoncé scored her fourth number-one with 4, which topped the chart for two weeks.

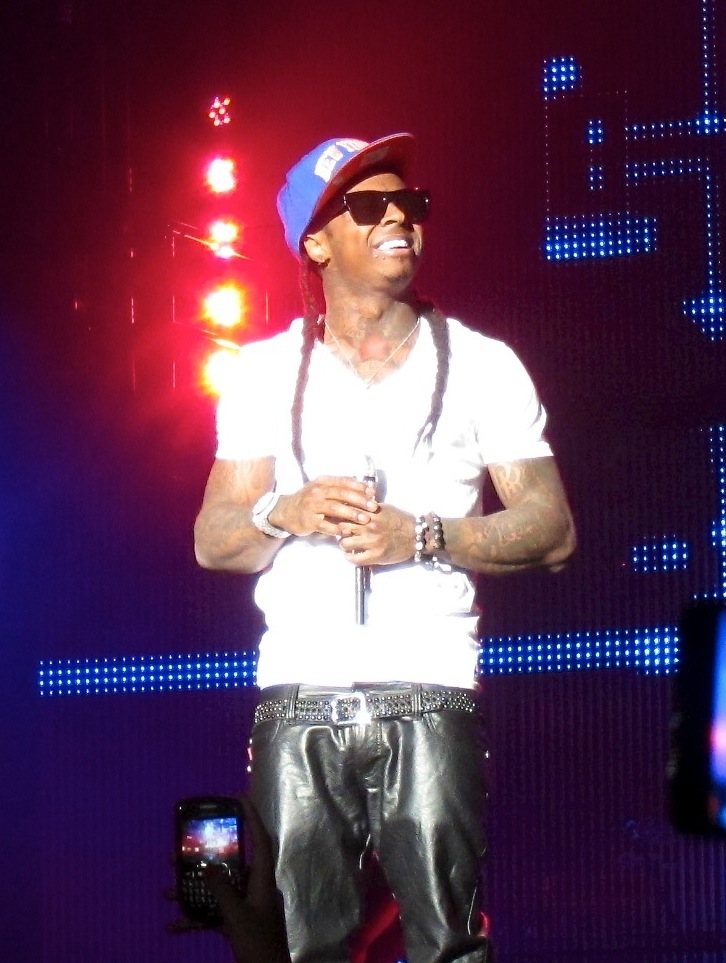
Rapper Lil Wayne's Tha Carter IV sold 964,000 copies in its first week, marking the second biggest opening-week sales of 2011.

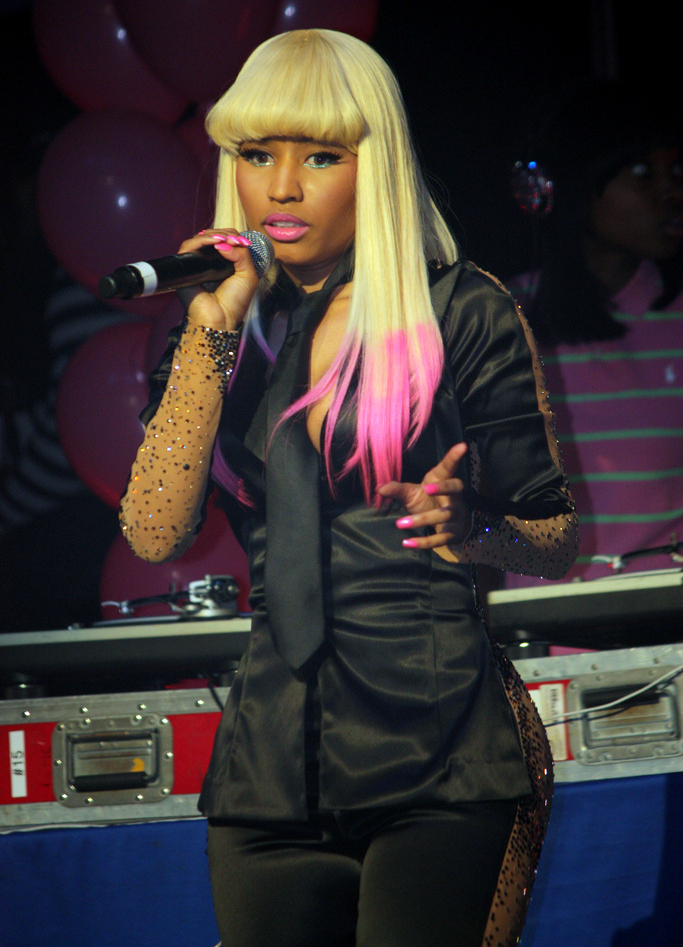
With Pink Friday, Nicki Minaj became the first female rapper since Eve in 1999 to achieve a number-one album.

Key
†	Indicates best performing album of 2011

Issue date	Album	Artist(s)	Sales	Ref.
January 1	Speak Now	Taylor Swift	259,000	
January 8	Speak Now	Taylor Swift	276,000	
January 15	Speak Now	Taylor Swift	77,000	
January 22	Speak Now	Taylor Swift	52,000	
January 29	Showroom of Compassion	Cake	44,000	
February 5	The King Is Dead	The Decemberists	94,000	
February 12	Mission Bell	Amos Lee	40,000	
February 19	Pink Friday	Nicki Minaj	45,000	
February 26	Now 37	Various Artists	151,000	
March 5	Never Say Never – The Remixes	Justin Bieber	165,000	
March 12	21 †	Adele	352,000	
March 19	21 †	Adele	168,000	
March 26	Lasers	Lupe Fiasco	204,000	
April 2	21 †	Adele	98,000	
April 9	F.A.M.E.	Chris Brown	270,000	
April 16	Femme Fatale	Britney Spears	276,000	
April 23	21 †	Adele	88,000	
April 30	Wasting Light	Foo Fighters	235,000	
May 7	21 †	Adele	153,000	
May 14	21 †	Adele	124,000	
May 21	21 †	Adele	155,000	
May 28	21 †	Adele	156,000	
June 4	21 †	Adele	137,000	
June 11	Born This Way	Lady Gaga	1,108,000	
June 18	Born This Way	Lady Gaga	174,000	
June 25	21 †	Adele	114,000	
July 2	Hell: The Sequel	Bad Meets Evil	171,000	
July 9	The Light of the Sun	Jill Scott	135,000	
July 16	4	Beyoncé	310,000	
July 23	4	Beyoncé	115,000	
July 30	Red River Blue	Blake Shelton	116,000	
August 6	21 †	Adele	77,000	
August 13	Chief	Eric Church	145,000	
August 20	21 †	Adele	76,000	
August 27	Watch the Throne	Jay-Z and Kanye West	436,000	
September 3	Watch the Throne	Jay-Z and Kanye West	177,000	
September 10	The R.E.D. Album	Game	98,000	
September 17	Tha Carter IV	Lil Wayne	964,000	
September 24	Tha Carter IV	Lil Wayne	219,000	
October 1	Own the Night	Lady Antebellum	347,000	
October 8	Duets II	Tony Bennett	179,000	
October 15	Cole World: The Sideline Story	J. Cole	218,000	
October 22	Clear as Day	Scotty McCreery	197,000	
October 29	Evanescence	Evanescence	127,000	
November 5	21 †	Adele	106,000	
November 12	Mylo Xyloto	Coldplay	447,000	
November 19	Under the Mistletoe	Justin Bieber	210,000	
November 26	Blue Slide Park	Mac Miller	144,000	
December 3	Take Care	Drake	631,000	
December 10	Christmas	Michael Bublé	227,000	
December 17	Christmas	Michael Bublé	293,000	
December 24	Christmas	Michael Bublé	479,000	
December 31	Christmas	Michael Bublé	448,000	

== See also ==
- 2011 in music
- List of Hot 100 number-one singles of 2011 (U.S.)
