= George "Spanky" McCurdy =

American drummer (born 1981)

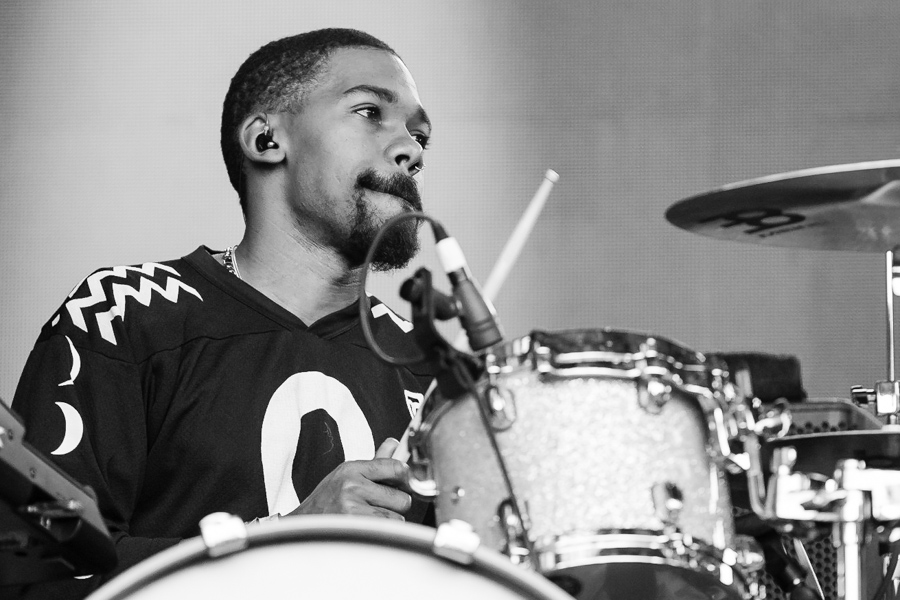
- McCurdy performing with Lauryn Hill in 2019

Background information
- Birth name: George McCurdy
- Born: June 28, 1981 (age 44); Olney, Philadelphia, Pennsylvania, U.S.
- Origin: Philadelphia
- Genres: Pop, gospel, neo soul, hip hop, house
- Occupation: Drummer
- Years active: 1994–present
- Website: www.myspace.com/spankydrumz

George "Spanky" McCurdy (born June 28, 1981) is an American drummer. Spanky has toured with Lady Gaga, Kanye West, P.Diddy, The Backstreet Boys, Jill Scott, and Floetry. He has also collaborated with Queen Latifah, Timbaland, Justin Timberlake, Q-Tip, Bubba Sparxxx, Nas, Brandy, and Tye Tribbett, among others.

== Life and career ==
=== Early life ===
George McCurdy grew up in Olney, a neighborhood located in North Philadelphia. At about age four, George was given the nickname “Spanky” and has gone by it ever since. Spanky’s love for music began at an early age. Growing up, he attended Settlement Music School then subsequently attended Boyer College of Music and Dance at Temple University, and received lessons from the famous drummer Little John Roberts.

=== Musical beginnings ===
Spanky’s childhood was surrounded by church and gospel music. He grew up watching the choir director and says it is why he is used to working with musical directors. Spanky also credits playing in church as the reason he is so fearless and has so much fire in his musical style. He also credits Philadelphia natives Little John Roberts, Vidal Davis, and Brian Frasier-Moore as his musical influences. By age 13, Spanky was playing with several local acts, including various gospel groups. It was through these groups that Spanky met other musicians that taught him what he knows today.

=== "Off Time/On Time" ===
In May 2013, Spanky and Hudson Music released an instructional DVD on drumming called “Off Time/On Time”. In the DVD, Spanky explains and demonstrates various drumming concepts in order to teach viewers new creative drum techniques.

== Discography ==
Year	Album	Artist	Credit
2002	Justified	Justin Timberlake	Drums
2002	A Love Story	Vivian Green	Drums
2003	Who Will I Run To/Kiss Me Like That	Kiley Dean	Drums
2003	Presents Don Cello and Friends	Larry Gold	Drums, Main Personnel
2003	Deliverance	Bubba Sparxxx	Drums
2004	Who Is She 2 U	Brandy	Percussion
2004	Somethin' 'Bout Love	Fred Hammond	Drums
2004	Life	Tye Tribbett & G.A.	Drums
2004	Beautifully Human: Words and Sounds, Vol. 2	Jill Scott	Congas, Drums, Main Personnel
2004	Afrodisiac	Brandy	Percussion
2005	The Appetizer	Eric Roberson	Drums
2006	Victory Live!	Tye Tribbett & G.A.	Drums, Member of Attributed Artist
2006	Surrounded	Men of Standard	Drums
2006	Bold and Beautiful	Vikter Duplaix	Drums, Main Personnel
2007	Tye Tribbett & G.A. Smooth Jazz Tribute	Smooth Jazz All Stars	Composer
2007	Trust You	Amy Dean	Drums
2007	The Very Best of Praise and Worship, Vol. 2	Various Artists	Composer
2007	The Real Thing: Words and Sounds, Vol. 3	Jill Scott	Drums
2007	Never Forget: A Journey of Revelations	Dr. Cornel West	Producer
2007	Luvanmusiq	Musiq (Soulchild)	Drums
2007	Celebrate!: Songs of Praise	Various Artists	Composer
2007	...Left	Eric Roberson	Drums
2008	Stand Out Live	Tye Tribbett	Drums
2008	Purpose	Algebra	Drums
2008	The Psalter	Jas Knight	Drums
2009	The Best of Gospel Superfest (CD/DVD)	Various Artists	Composer
2009	Songs 4 Worship: Friend of God	Various Artists	Composer
2010	My Soul	Leela James	Drums
2010	I Believe: Live	James Fortune	Drums
2010	Finally	Lowell Pye	Drums
2011	The Original Jill Scott from the Vault, Vol. 1	Jill Scott	Composer, Drums, Producer
2011	The Light of the Sun	Jill Scott	Composer, Drums, Producer
2011	The Sound of Victory	Maurette Brown Clark	Drums
2011	Born This Way: The Collection	Lady Gaga	Drums
2012	So In Love	Amber Bullock	Composer
2013	Off Time/On Time (DVD)		Composer, Drums
