= Summer Block Party =

2011–12 concert tour by Jill Scott

- Tour by Jill Scott
- Promotional poster for tour
- Associated album: The Light of the Sun
- Start date: July 26, 2011
- End date: June 30, 2012
- Legs: 2
- No. of shows: 25 in North America

Jill Scott concert chronology
- Maxwell & Jill Scott: The Tour (2010); Summer Block Party (2011–2012); An Evening with Jill Scott (2011–2013)

Summer Block Party was a music concert tour by American R&B/soul artist, Jill Scott. Primarily visiting the United States, the tour supported her fourth studio album, The Light of the Sun. The tour was hosted by Doug E. Fresh and featured sets by DJ Jazzy Jeff, giving the tour the "block party" vibe. With 18 shows in 2011, the tour was extended with additional dates for a one-month run in June 2012.

== Background ==
The tour was announced on Scott's official website on June 2, 2011. Sponsored by famed concert series "Budweiser Superfest", the outing played amphitheaters in the U.S. during the summer season. On June 17, 2011, fans were given the opportunity to purchase concert tickets and pre-order Scott's album through Live Nation. The success of the 2011 show prompted Scott to add shows during the summer of 2012. Joining the singer on tour are Kem, Salt-n-Pepa and Eric Roberson. Additionally, Scott launched a contest for an opening act for her show in Atlanta.

== Opening acts ==
- Anthony Hamilton (2011)
- Mint Condition (2011)
- Jeff Bradshaw (2012)
- Kem (2012)
- Salt-n-Pepa (2012—Washington, D.C.)
- Eric Roberson (2012—Philadelphia)

== Tour dates ==
List of 2011 concerts
Date	City	Country	Venue
July 26, 2011	Boston	United States	Bank of America Pavilion
July 28, 2011	Wantagh	United States	Nikon at Jones Beach Theater
July 30, 2011	Clarkston	United States	DTE Energy Music Theatre
July 31, 2011	Chicago	United States	Charter One Pavilion
August 3, 2011	Cleveland	United States	Jacobs Pavilion at Nautica
August 4, 2011	Maryland Heights	United States	Verizon Wireless Amphitheater
August 6, 2011	Camden	United States	Susquehanna Bank Center
August 7, 2011	Washington, D.C.	United States	Verizon Center
August 10, 2011	Los Angeles	United States	Gibson Amphitheatre
August 14, 2011	Concord	United States	Sleep Train Pavilion
August 17, 2011	Memphis	United States	FedExForum
August 19, 2011	Atlanta	United States	Chastain Park Amphitheater
August 20, 2011	Atlanta	United States	Chastain Park Amphitheater
August 21, 2011	Virginia Beach	United States	Farm Bureau Live
August 23, 2011	Raleigh	United States	Time Warner Cable Music Pavilion
August 24, 2011	Charlotte	United States	Verizon Wireless Amphitheatre
August 27, 2011	Dallas	United States	Gexa Energy Pavilion
August 28, 2011	Houston	United States	Reliant Arena

List of 2012 concerts
Date	City	Country	Venue
June 14, 2012	Chicago	United States	Charter One Pavilion
June 17, 2012	Detroit	United States	Fox Theatre
June 21, 2012	Washington, D.C.	United States	Verizon Center
June 23, 2012	Philadelphia	United States	Mann Center for the Performing Arts
June 24, 2012^{[D]}	Hampton	United States	Hampton Coliseum
June 28, 2012	Thackerville	United States	Global Event Center
June 30, 2012	Atlanta	United States	Chastain Park Amphitheater

=== Box office score data ===
Venue	City	Tickets sold / available	Gross revenue
DTE Energy Music Theatre	Clarkston	8,045 / 15,274 (53%)	$413,989
Verizon Center	Washington, D.C.	15,345 / 21,463 (71%)	$1,589,931

Festivals and other miscellaneous performances

^{D} This concert is a part of the "Hampton Jazz Festival"
