= Darreh Kerdi =

Darreh Kerdi دره كردي
- Village
- Location within Iran
- Coordinates: 30°23′50″N 55°24′59″E
- Country: Iran
- Province: Kerman
- County: Rafsanjan
- Bakhsh: Koshkuiyeh
- Rural District: Raviz

Population (2006)
  - Total: 80
- Time zone: UTC+3:30 (IRST)
  - Summer (DST): UTC+4:30 (IRDT)

Darreh Kerdi (Persian: دره كردي, also Romanized as Darreh Kerdī; also known as Barz, Borz, Bowrz, and Burz) is a village in Raviz Rural District, Koshkuiyeh District, Rafsanjan County, Kerman Province, Iran. At the 2006 census, its population was 80, in 20 families.
