= Self Made Vol. 1 =

Compilation album by Maybach Music Group
- Released: May 24, 2011
- Recorded: 2010–2011
- Genre: Hip hop
- Length: 69:26
- Labels: Maybach; Def Jam; Warner Bros.; WMGreen
- Producers: Beat Billionaire; Cardiak; DJ Spinz; Eardrummers; Just Blaze; Jahlil Beats; Lee Major of The Inkredibles; Lex Luger; Lil' Lody; Mike WiLL Made It; Tone P; Young Shun

Maybach Music Group chronology
Self Made Vol. 1 (2011)	Self Made Vol. 2 (2012)

Singles from Self Made, Vol. 1
- 1. "Tupac Back" Released: April 5, 2011; 2. "Pacman" Released: April 9, 2011; 3. "By Any Means" Released: May 10, 2011; 4. "Fitted Cap" Released: May 17, 2011; 5. "Ima Boss" Released: May 17, 2011; 6. "600 Benz" Released: June 14, 2011; 7. "That Way" Released: August 30, 2011

Self Made Vol. 1 is the first compilation album by MMG. The album was released on May 24, 2011, by Maybach Music Group, Warner Bros. Records, and Def Jam Recordings. It features MMG's new roster additions, Wale, Meek Mill, Teedra Moses, Pill and Stalley along with Torch and Gunplay of Triple C's. Outside of the label, the album features guest appearances from Curren$y, Jadakiss, Jeremih, J. Cole, CyHi the Prynce and French Montana.

"Play Your Part" was previously released on Rick Ross' 2010 mixtape, Ashes to Ashes, while "Pandemonium" was also previously released along with a music video. The album was planned to be released on May 24, 2011, but got pushed up one day to May 23, 2011. The album sold 58,900 copies in its first week, debuting at number 5 on the US Billboard 200 and number 1 on the Top Rap Albums and Top R&B/Hip Hop Albums charts. As of November 25, 2011, the album has sold 183,000 copies in the United States.

== Background ==
In an early March interview with Rap Radar, Rick Ross was asked if there were any plans of releasing a Maybach Music compilation album to introduce his new label-mates. Ross responded to the question stating:

"I think we will bypass the compilation aspect but we’re gonna be releasing mixtapes. I was on the phone with DJ Drama last night discussing the possibility of a Maybach music, Gangsta Grillz. Like what we could do to make it different, you know. We had a good conversation."

However, a few hours after the interview was posted to the internet, Rick Ross seemed to have a change of heart. He soon announced that he and Maybach Music Group will be releasing their first compilation album, Self Made, and will be distributed through his new deal with Warner Bros. Production of the album is handled by Cardiak, Just Blaze, Lex Luger, Lee Major, and many more. On April 18 the official track listing was revealed.

== Singles ==
Prior to the release of Self Made, Vol. 1, five singles were released: "Tupac Back" featuring Meek Mill and Rick Ross was released as the lead single on April 5, 2011. The song peaked at number 31 on the Hot R&B/Hip-Hop Songs and number 22 on the Rap Songs charts. "Pacman" featuring Ross and Pill was released two days later as the second single. On May 10, "By Any Means" was released as the third single, and features Ross, Mill, Wale and Pill. On May 17, "Fitted Cap" featuring Wale, Mill, Ross and J. Cole, and "Ima Boss" featuring Mill and Ross, were released as the fourth and fifth singles, respectively. "Ima Boss" peaked at number 51 on the Billboard Hot 100 in the US, number 20 on the Hot R&B/Hip-Hop Songs chart at number one on the Heatseekers Songs charts. The remix version of "Ima Boss", features T.I., Birdman, Lil Wayne, Ross, DJ Khaled and Swizz Beatz was released to iTunes on February 7, 2012.

After the album's release, the sixth single, "600 Benz" featuring Wale, Ross and Jadakiss was released on June 14, 2011. The song was produced by Cardiak. "That Way", the seventh single featuring Wale, Ross and Jeremih was released on August 30. "That Way" was produced by Lex Luger. The song peaked at number 49 on the Hot 100. The song also appears as the final track on Wale's second studio album, Ambition.

== Critical reception ==
Professional ratings
Aggregate scores
Source	Rating
Metacritic	66/100
Review scores
Source	Rating
AllMusic	3.5/5 stars
DJ Booth	3.5/5 stars
HipHopDX	3/5 stars
Pitchfork	5.3/10
PopMatters	5/10 stars
Prefix Magazine	7/10
Rolling Stone	3.5/5 stars
The Smoking Section	3/5 stars
XXL	3/5 (L)

MMG Presents: Self Made, Vol. 1 has received generally favorable reviews from music critics. At Metacritic, which assigns a normalized rating out of 100 to reviews from mainstream critics, the album received an average score of 66, based on 7 reviews, which indicates "generally favorable".

== Track listing ==
No.	Title	Producer(s)	Length
1.	"Self Made" (Wale, Meek Mill, Pill, Rick Ross and Teedra Moses)	Just Blaze	5:03
2.	"Tupac Back" (Meek Mill featuring Rick Ross)	Mike WiLL Made It; Marz	3:56
3.	"600 Benz" (Wale featuring Rick Ross and Jadakiss)	Cardiak; Lex Luger (co.)	5:08
4.	"Pacman" (Pill featuring Rick Ross)	Young Shun	4:17
5.	"By Any Means" (Wale, Meek Mill, Pill and Rick Ross)	Lil' Lody	4:23
6.	"Fitted Cap" (Wale, Meek Mill and Rick Ross featuring J. Cole)	Beat Billionaire	4:33
7.	"Rise" (Pill, Wale and Teedra Moses featuring Curren$y and Cyhi the Prynce)	Cardiak	5:26
8.	"That Way" (Wale featuring Jeremih and Rick Ross)	Lex Luger	4:30
9.	"Ima Boss" (Meek Mill featuring Rick Ross)	Jahlil Beats	4:10
10.	"Don't Let Me Go" (Pill featuring Gunplay)	Lee Major	4:04
11.	"Pandemonium" (Rick Ross, Meek Mill and Wale)	Lee Major	6:00
12.	"Play Your Part" (Rick Ross, Wale and Meek Mill featuring D.A. from Chester French)	Lee Major	4:57
13.	"Ridin' On Dat Pole" (Pill)	Raz of Beat Billionaire	3:20
14.	"Big Bank" (Meek Mill, Pill, Torch and Rick Ross featuring French Montana)	Young Shun	4:44
15.	"Running Rebels" (Wale featuring Meek Mill, Stalley and Teedra Moses)	Tone P	4:55

== Personnel ==
Credits for MMG Presents: Self Made, Vol. 1 adapted from Allmusic:

- Olubowale Akintimehin – Composer
- Young Shun – Producer
- Beat Billionaire – Producer
- Jahlil Beats – Producer
- Jermaine Cole – Composer
- Shamann Cooke – Composer
- Eardrummers – Producer
- Leigh Elliott – Composer
- Jeremiah Felton – Composer
- Danny Flam – Horn
- Shante Franklin – Composer
- Ricardo Gutierrez – Mastering
- Antoine "Lil Lody" Kearney – Composer
- Brent Kolatalo – Keyboards
- Ken Lewis – Bass, Guitar
- Lil Lody – Producer
- Lee Major – Producer
- Dallas Martin – A&R
- Carl McCormick – Composer, Producer
- Marquel Middlebrooks – Composer
- Richard Morales Jr. – Composer
- Teedra Moses – Composer
- Jahlil Orlando – Composer
- Keith Parry – Assistant Engineer
- Ernest Price – Composer
- Ernest Prince – Composer
- Miguel "Che" – Composer
- John Rivers – Mixing
- Tyrone Rivers – Composer
- William Roberts III – Composer, Executive Producer
- Robert Williams – Composer
- TaVon Sampson – Art Direction, Design
- Ray Seay – Mixing
- Smallz – Photography
- Jason Smith – Composer
- Justin Smith – Mastering
- Justin Smith – Composer, Engineer, Mixing, Producer
- Carlos Suarez – A&R
- Adrian P. Taylor – Bass
- Tone P – Producer
- Roshun Walker – Composer
- David-Andrew Wallach – Composer
- Dylan Wissing – Drums
- Andrew Wright – Engineer, Mixing
- Young Guru – Mixing
- Cydell Young – Composer
- Danny Zook – Sample Clearance

== Charts ==
=== Weekly charts ===
Chart (2011)	Peak position
US Billboard 200	5
US Top R&B/Hip-Hop Albums (Billboard)	1

=== Year-end charts ===
Chart (2011)	Position
US Billboard 200	196
US Top R&B/Hip-Hop Albums (Billboard)	45
