= Chris Barz =

American musician

- Origin: Washington, D.C., United States
- Genres: Hip hop, go-go, fusion, jazz, dance, electronica, pop, R&B, alternative, dubstep
- Instrument(s): Vocals, piano, guitar, drums, synthesizer
- Website: chrisbarz.com

Chris Barz is an American musician. He began his love for music on a piano at the age of three. At the age of 11 he developed a passion for rapping, and freestyle cyphers which created a love for bars, rhyming and clever wordplay. Barz started recording songs on a boombox tape recorder. At the age of 12, he was introduced to an MPC2000 XL and started producing beats and writing songs in middle school. Barz played in many popular young go-go bands growing up in Prince George's County, Maryland and the District of Columbia, including his own go-go band called Total Assault. One day, while headed to shoot a video, Barz was riding passenger of a vehicle that was struck by a truck and totaled. Surviving with minor injuries, only to be involved in a similar accident with a truck totaling the vehicle while riding to band practice in Washington D.C. a second time. Feeling like he had a third shot at life, Barz began to live a life dedicated to leaving a legacy through music. His first hip-hop/rap mixtape landed him as Complex magazine's 10 New DMV Rappers to Watch Out For, XXL Magazine's 15 DMV Artists You Need To Know, and The Washington Post.

His love for piano and composition has led him to score songs for movies and stage plays. The stage play 7 Layers Captive by Stacy Jewell Lewis won Best Play & Performance in Professional Theater and premiered at the John F Kennedy Center for Performing Arts. On November 27, his collaboration with Chris Brown, "Just So You Know" was released, which was produced and written by Barz.

== Production and songwriting discography ==
=== Wale – Ambition ===
- "Don't Hold Your Applause" (Produced)

=== Jesse Boykins III – Young Love EP ===
- "Pantyhose (Remix)" (Produced)

=== Estelle – True Romance ===
- "Timeshare (Suite 509)" (Produced)

=== Chris Brown – Before The Party ===
- "Just So You Know" (Written & Produced)

== Stage plays and cinema compositions ==
=== 7 Layers Captive – by Stacy Jewell Lewis ===
- "Winner of Best Play & Performance in Professional Theater 2015, John F Kennedy Center for Performing Arts- (Music Scored & Composed)
